= List of wavelet-related transforms =

A list of wavelet related transforms:

- Continuous wavelet transform (CWT)
- Discrete wavelet transform (DWT)
- Multiresolution analysis (MRA)
- Lifting scheme
- Binomial QMF (BQMF)
- Fast wavelet transform (FWT)
- Complex wavelet transform
- Non or undecimated wavelet transform, the downsampling is omitted
- Newland transform, an orthonormal basis of wavelets is formed from appropriately constructed top-hat filters in frequency space
- Wavelet packet decomposition (WPD), detail coefficients are decomposed and a variable tree can be formed
- Stationary wavelet transform (SWT), no downsampling and the filters at each level are different
- e-decimated discrete wavelet transform, depends on if the even or odd coefficients are selected in the downsampling
- Second generation wavelet transform (SGWT), filters and wavelets are not created in the frequency domain
- Dual-tree complex wavelet transform (DTCWT), two trees are used for decomposion to produce the real and complex coefficients
- WITS: Where Is The Starlet, a collection of a hundredth of wavelet names in -let and associated multiscale, directional, geometric, representations, from activelets to x-lets through bandelets, chirplets, contourlets, curvelets, noiselets, wedgelets ...
