= Dual wavelet =

In mathematics, a dual wavelet is the dual to a wavelet. In general, the wavelet series generated by a square-integrable function will have a dual series, in the sense of the Riesz representation theorem. However, the dual series is not itself in general representable by a square-integrable function.

== Definition ==
Given a square-integrable function $\psi\in L^2(\mathbb{R})$, define the series $\{\psi_{jk}\}$ by

$$\psi_{jk}(x) = 2^{j/2}\psi(2^jx-k)$$

for integers $j,k\in \mathbb{Z}$.

Such a function is called an R-function if the linear span of $\{\psi_{jk}\}$ is dense in $L^2(\mathbb{R})$, and if there exist positive constants A, B with $0<A\leq B < \infty$ such that

$$A \Vert c_{jk} \Vert^2_{l^2} \leq
\bigg\Vert \sum_{jk=-\infty}^\infty c_{jk}\psi_{jk}\bigg\Vert^2_{L^2} \leq
B \Vert c_{jk} \Vert^2_{l^2}\,$$

for all bi-infinite square summable series $\{c_{jk}\}$. Here, $\Vert \cdot \Vert_{l^2}$ denotes the square-sum norm:

$$\Vert c_{jk} \Vert^2_{l^2} = \sum_{jk=-\infty}^\infty \vert c_{jk}\vert^2$$

and $\Vert \cdot\Vert_{L^2}$ denotes the usual norm on $L^2(\mathbb{R})$:

$$\Vert f\Vert^2_{L^2}= \int_{-\infty}^\infty \vert f(x)\vert^2 dx$$

By the Riesz representation theorem, there exists a unique dual basis $\psi^{jk}$ such that

$$\langle \psi^{jk} \vert \psi_{lm} \rangle = \delta_{jl} \delta_{km}$$

where $\delta_{jk}$ is the Kronecker delta and $\langle f \vert g \rangle$ is the usual inner product on $L^2(\mathbb{R})$. Indeed, there exists a unique series representation for a square-integrable function f expressed in this basis:

$$f(x) = \sum_{jk} \langle \psi^{jk} \vert f \rangle \psi_{jk}(x)$$

If there exists a function $\tilde{\psi} \in L^2(\mathbb{R})$ such that

$$\tilde{\psi}_{jk} = \psi^{jk}$$

then $\tilde{\psi}$ is called the dual wavelet or the wavelet dual to ψ. In general, for some given R-function ψ, the dual will not exist. In the special case of $\psi = \tilde{\psi}$, the wavelet is said to be an orthogonal wavelet.

An example of an R-function without a dual is easy to construct. Let $\phi$ be an orthogonal wavelet. Then define $\psi(x) = \phi(x) + z\phi(2x)$ for some complex number z. It is straightforward to show that this ψ does not have a wavelet dual.

== See also ==
- Multiresolution analysis
