= ECW (file format) =

File format for aerial photography

Enhanced Compression Wavelet
- Filename extension: .ecw
- Developed by: Hexagon Geospatial
- Initial release: 1998
- Latest release: ECW v3 - ECW/JP2 SDK v5.5 Update 6 November 25, 2024
- Type of format: Image file format
- Website: https://hexagon.com/products/ecw-compression

ECW (Enhanced Compression Wavelet) is a proprietary wavelet compression image format used for aerial photography and satellite imagery. It was developed by Earth Resource Mapping, which is now owned by Intergraph, part of Hexagon AB. It is a lossy compression format for images.

In 1998 Earth Resource Mapping Ltd in Perth, Western Australia company founder Stuart Nixon (founder of Nearmap) and two software developers Simon Cope and Mark Sheridan were researching rapid delivery of terabyte sized images over the internet using inexpensive server technology. The outcome of that research was two products, Image Web Server (IWS) and ECW. ECW enables discrete wavelet transforms (DWT) and inverse-DWT operations to be performed quickly on large images while using a relatively small amount of memory. Related (now expired) patents included US 6201897 and US 6442298 for ECW and US 6633688 for IWS. These patents were obtained by ERDAS Inc. through the acquisition of Earth Resource Mapping on May 21, 2007. Indirectly Hexagon AB became owner of these patents because they acquired Leica Geosystems in 2005 who had acquired ERDAS Inc in 2001.

After JPEG2000 became an image standard, ER Mapper added tools to read and write JPEG2000 data into the ECW SDK to form the ECW JPEG2000 SDK. After subsequent purchase by ERDAS (themselves subsequently merged into Intergraph), the software development kit was renamed to the ERDAS ECW/JP2 SDK. v5 of the SDK was released on 2 July 2013.

== Properties ==
Map projection information can be embedded into the ECW file format to support geospatial applications.

Image data of up to 65,535 bands (layers or colors) can be compressed into the ECW v2 or v3 file format at a rate of over 25 MB per second on an i7 740QM (4-cores) 1.731 GHz processor using v4.2 of the ECW/JP2 SDK. Data flow compression allows for compression of large images with small RAM requirements. The file format can achieve typical compression ratios from 1:2 to 1:100.

The ECW Protocol (ECWP) is an efficient streaming protocol used to transmit ECW and JPEG2000 images over networks, such as the Internet. ECWP supports ECWPS for private and secure encrypted streaming of image data over public networks such as the Internet.

There is a very fast read-only SDK supporting ECW and JPEG2000 which is available for no charge for desktop implementation for Windows, Linux and MacOSX. A read / write SDK can be purchased for desktop and server implementations for Windows, Linux and MacOSX. A full functioning server implementation (using ECW, JPEG2000, ECWP and JPIP) was offered within the PROVIDER SUITE of the Power Portfolio (formerly IWS) license.

A previous version of the SDK (3.3) from 2006 has been released as source-available software, with community patches also available.
