= WPD =

WPD may refer to:

== Businesses and organisations ==
- wpd group, a German wind power generation group
- Western Police District, Manila, Philippines
- Western Power Distribution, a British trade name
- Wichita Police Department, Kansas, United States

== Technology ==
- Wavelet packet decomposition, a signal processing model
- WebPlatform Docs, a Web standards collaboration
- .wpd, a WordPerfect document

== Other uses ==
- WatchPeopleDie, a controversial website and former subreddit
- World Poetry Day, observed in March
- World Prematurity Day, observed in November
- Waurn Ponds railway station, Victoria, Australia
