= Multiresolution Fourier transform =

Multiresolution Fourier Transform is an integral fourier transform that represents a specific wavelet-like transform with a fully scalable modulated window, but not all possible translations.

== Comparison of Fourier transform and wavelet transform ==
The Fourier transform is one of the most common approaches when it comes to digital signal processing and signal analysis. It represents a signal through sine and cosine functions thus transforming the time-domain into frequency-domain. A disadvantage of the Fourier transform is that both sine and cosine function are defined in the whole time plane, meaning that there is no time resolution. Certain variants of Fourier transform, such as Short Time Fourier Transform (STFT) utilize a window for sampling, but the window length is fixed meaning that the results will be satisfactory only for either low or high frequency components. Fast fourier transform (FFT) is used often because of its computational speed, but shows better results for stationary signals.

On the other hand, the wavelet transform can improve all the aforementioned downsides. It preserves both time and frequency information and it uses a window of variable length, meaning that both low and high frequency components will be derived with higher accuracy than the Fourier transform. The wavelet transform also shows better results in transient states. Multiresolution Fourier Transform leverages the advantageous properties of the wavelet transform and uses them for Fourier transform.

== Definition ==
Let $f(t)$ be a function that has its Fourier transform defined as

$F(\omega)=\int_{-\infty}^{\infty} f(t) \cos (\omega t) d t-j \int_{-\infty}^{\infty} f(t) \sin (\omega t) d t$ (Eq.1)

The time line can be split by intervals of length π/ω with centers at integer multiples of π/ω

$I_{n}=I_{n}(\omega)=\left[\frac{(2 n-1) \pi}{2 \omega}, \frac{(2 n+1) \pi}{2 \omega}\right), n=0, \pm 1, \pm 2, \ldots$ (Eq.2)

Then, new transforms of function $f(t)$ can be introduced

$F_{\Psi}\left(\omega, b_{n}\right)=\int_{-\infty}^{\infty} f(t) \Psi_{\omega, b_{n}} d t$ (Eq.3)
$F_{\Psi}(0,0)=\int_{-\infty}^{\infty} f(t) d t$ (Eq.4)

and

$F_{\varphi}\left(\omega, b_{n}\right)=\int_{-\infty}^{\infty} f(t) \varphi_{\omega, b_{n}} d t$ (Eq.5)
$F_{\varphi}(0,0)=0$ (Eq.6)

where $b_{n}=b_{n}(\omega)=\frac{\pi}{\omega} n$, when n is an integer.

Functions $F_{\Psi}$ and $F_{\varphi}$ can be used in order to define the complex Fourier transform

$F(\omega)=\sum_{n=-\infty}^{\infty}(-1)^{n} F_{\Psi}\left(\omega, b_{n}\right)-\sum_{n=-\infty}^{\infty}(-1)^{n} F_{\varphi}\left(\omega, b_{n}\right)$ (Eq.7)

Then, set of points in the frequency-time plane is defined for the computation of the introduced transforms

$B=\left\{\left(\omega, b_{n}\right) ; \omega \in(-\infty, \infty), b_{n}=n \frac{\pi}{\omega}, n=0, \pm 1, \pm 2, \ldots, \pm \mathrm{N}(\omega)\right\}$ (Eq.8)

where $N(0)=0$, and $N(\omega)$ is the infinite in general, or a finite number if the function $f(t)$ has a finite support. The defined representation of $f(t)$ with the functions $F_{\Psi}$ and $F_{\varphi}$ is called the B-wavelet transform, and is used to define the integral Fourier transform.

The cosine and sine B-wavelet transforms are:

$f(t) \rightarrow\left\{F_{\psi}\left(\omega, b_{n}\right),\left(\omega, b_{n}\right) \in B\right\}$ (Eq.9)
$f(t) \rightarrow\left\{F_{\varphi}\left(\omega, b_{n}\right),\left(\omega, b_{n}\right) \in B\right\}$ (Eq.10)

B-wavelet doesn't need to be calculated across the whole range of frequency-time points, but only in the points of set B. The integral Fourier transform can then be defined from B-wavelet transform using.

Now Fourier transform can be represented via two integral wavelet transforms sampled by only translation parameter:

$T_{\Psi}(\omega, \mathrm{b})=\int_{-\infty}^{\infty} f(t) \Psi_{\omega, \mathrm{b}} d t$ (Eq.11)
$T_{\varphi}(\omega, \mathrm{b})=\int_{-\infty}^{\infty} f(t) \varphi_{\omega, \mathrm{b}} d t$ (Eq.12)

== Applications ==
Multiresolution Fourier Transform is applied in fields such as image and audio signal analysis, curve and corner extraction, and edge detection.

== See also ==
- Fourier transform
- Wavelet transform
