= Complex wavelet transform =

The complex wavelet transform (CWT) is a complex-valued extension to the standard discrete wavelet transform (DWT). It is a two-dimensional wavelet transform which provides multiresolution, sparse representation, and useful characterization of the structure of an image. Further, it purveys a high degree of shift-invariance in its magnitude, which was investigated in. However, a drawback to this transform is that it exhibits $2^{d}$ (where $d$ is the dimension of the signal being transformed) redundancy compared to a separable (DWT).

The use of complex wavelets in image processing was originally set up in 1995 by J.M. Lina and L. Gagnon in the framework of the Daubechies orthogonal filters banks. It was then generalized in 1997 by Nick Kingsbury of Cambridge University.

In the area of computer vision, by exploiting the concept of visual contexts, one can quickly focus on candidate regions, where objects of interest may be found, and then compute additional features through the CWT for those regions only. These additional features, while not necessary for global regions, are useful in accurate detection and recognition of smaller objects. Similarly, the CWT may be applied to detect the activated voxels of cortex and additionally the temporal independent component analysis (tICA) may be utilized to extract the underlying independent sources whose number is determined by Bayesian information criterion.

== Dual-tree complex wavelet transform ==
The dual-tree complex wavelet transform (DTCWT) calculates the complex transform of a signal using two separate DWT decompositions (tree a and tree b). If the filters used in one are specifically designed different from those in the other it is possible for one DWT to produce the real coefficients and the other the imaginary.

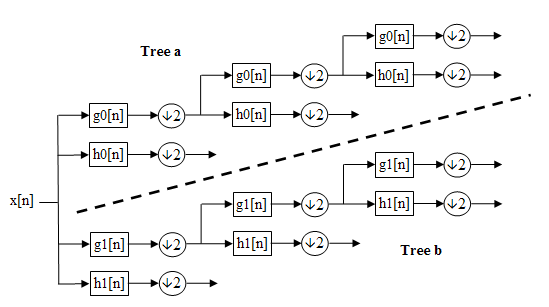
Block diagram for a 3-level DTCWT

This redundancy of two provides extra information for analysis but at the expense of extra computational power. It also provides approximate shift-invariance (unlike the DWT) yet still allows perfect reconstruction of the signal.

The design of the filters is particularly important for the transform to occur correctly and the necessary characteristics are:

- The low-pass filters in the two trees must differ by half a sample period
- Reconstruction filters are the reverse of analysis
- All filters from the same orthonormal set
- Tree a filters are the reverse of tree b filters
- Both trees have the same frequency response

== See also ==
- Continuous wavelet transform
- Wavelet series
