= Harten =

Harten is a surname of German or Dutch origin. Notable people with the surname include:

- Ami Harten (1946–1994), American-Israeli applied mathematician
- James Harten (1924–2001), Australian cricketer
- Jo Harten (born 1989), English netball player
- Patrick Harten, American air traffic controller
- Uwe Harten (born 1944), German musicologist

== See also ==
- Gus Van Harten
- Wilde Harten
- Young Hearts (1936 film)
