= Binomial QMF =

A binomial QMF – properly an orthonormal binomial quadrature mirror filter – is an orthogonal wavelet developed in 1990.

The binomial QMF bank with perfect reconstruction (PR) was designed by Ali Akansu and published in 1990, using the family of binomial polynomials for subband decomposition of discrete-time signals. Akansu and his fellow authors also showed that these binomial-QMF filters are identical to the wavelet filters designed independently by Ingrid Daubechies from compactly supported orthonormal wavelet transform perspective in 1988 (Daubechies wavelet). It was an extension of Akansu's prior work on binomial coefficient and Hermite polynomials wherein he developed the modified Hermite transformation (MHT) in 1987.

Later, it was shown that the magnitude square functions of low-pass and high-pass binomial-QMF filters are the unique maximally flat functions in a two-band PR-QMF design framework.
