= Adjoint filter =

In signal processing, the adjoint filter mask $h^*$ of a filter mask $h$ is reversed in time and the elements are complex conjugated.

$$(h^*)_k = \overline{h_{-k}}$$

Its name is derived from the fact that the convolution with the adjoint filter is the adjoint operator of the original filter, with respect to the Hilbert space $\ell_2$ of the sequences in which the inner product is the Euclidean norm.

$$\langle h*x, y \rangle = \langle x, h^* * y \rangle$$

The autocorrelation of a signal $x$ can be written as $x^* * x$.

== Properties ==
- ${h^*}^* = h$
- $(h*g)^* = h^* * g^*$
- $(h\leftarrow k)^* = h^* \rightarrow k$
