= Stéphane Mallat =

French mathematician (born 1962)

Stéphane G. Mallat
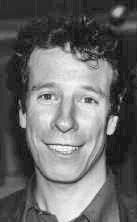
- Stéphane Mallat
- Born: 24 October 1962 (age 63); Paris, France
- Education: Ecole Polytechnique
- Known for: Multiresolution Analysis, Wavelet methods in signal processing
- Awards: Prix Blaise Pascal (1997) French Academy of Sciences; CNRS Gold Medal (2025)
- Scientific career
- Fields: Applied mathematics
- Workplaces: Ecole Polytechnique, Ecole Normale Superieure
- Doctoral advisor: Ruzena Bajcsy
- Doctoral students: Gabriel Peyré; Irène Waldspurger

Stéphane Georges Mallat (born 24 October 1962) is a French applied mathematician, concurrently appointed as Professor at Collège de France and École normale supérieure. He made fundamental contributions to the development of wavelet theory in the late 1980s and early 1990s. He has additionally done work in applied mathematics, signal processing, music synthesis and image segmentation.

With Yves Meyer, he developed the multiresolution analysis (MRA) construction for compactly supported wavelets. His MRA wavelet construction made the implementation of wavelets practical for engineering applications by demonstrating the equivalence of wavelet bases and conjugate mirror filters used in discrete, multirate filter banks in signal processing. He also developed (with Sifen Zhong) the wavelet transform modulus maxima method for image characterization, a method that uses the local maxima of the wavelet coefficients at various scales to reconstruct images.

He introduced the scattering transform that constructs invariance for object recognition purposes. Mallat is the author of A Wavelet Tour of Signal Processing (1999; ISBN 012466606X), a text widely used in applied mathematics and engineering courses.

He has held teaching positions at New York University, Massachusetts Institute of Technology, École polytechnique and at the Ecole normale supérieure. He is currently Professor of Data Science at College de France.

In 1998 he was a plenary speaker at the International Congress of Mathematicians in Berlin.

== Awards ==
In 2025 he received the CNRS Gold Medal. In 2025, he was considered a candidate for a Nobel Prize in Physics by the Clarivate Citation Laureates.

== Publications ==
- A wavelet tour of signal processing: the sparse way, Academic Press, 1998, 3rd edn. 2009
- Mallat, S.G. (1989). "A theory for multiresolution signal decomposition: the wavelet representation" (PDF). IEEE Transactions on Pattern Analysis and Machine Intelligence. 11 (7): 674–693. doi:10.1109/34.192463.
- Mallat, Stephane G. (1989). "Multiresolution approximations and wavelet orthonormal bases of $L^2 (R)$". Transactions of the American Mathematical Society. 315: 69–87. doi:10.1090/s0002-9947-1989-1008470-5. MR 1008470.
- Mallat, S. (1996). "Wavelets for a vision". Proceedings of the IEEE (in French). 84 (4): 604–614. doi:10.1109/5.488702.
