= Orthogonal wavelet =

Wavelet whose associated wavelet transform is orthogonal

An orthogonal wavelet is a wavelet whose associated wavelet transform is orthogonal. That is, the inverse wavelet transform is the adjoint of the wavelet transform. If this condition is weakened one may end up with biorthogonal wavelets.

== Basics ==
The scaling function is a refinable function. That is, it is a fractal functional equation, called the refinement equation (twin-scale relation or dilation equation):

$$\phi(x)=\sum_{k=0}^{N-1} a_k\phi(2x-k)$$,

where the sequence $(a_0,\dots, a_{N-1})$ of real numbers is called a scaling sequence or scaling mask. The wavelet proper is obtained by a similar linear combination,

$$\psi(x)=\sum_{k=0}^{M-1} b_k\phi(2x-k)$$,

where the sequence $(b_0,\dots, b_{M-1})$ of real numbers is called a wavelet sequence or wavelet mask.

A necessary condition for the orthogonality of the wavelets is that the scaling sequence is orthogonal to any shifts of it by an even number of coefficients:

$$\sum_{n\in\Z} a_n a_{n+2m}=2\delta_{m,0}$$,

where $\delta_{m,n}$ is the Kronecker delta.

In this case there is the same number M=N of coefficients in the scaling as in the wavelet sequence, the wavelet sequence can be determined as $b_n=(-1)^n a_{N-1-n}$. In some cases the opposite sign is chosen.

== Vanishing moments, polynomial approximation and smoothness ==
A necessary condition for the existence of a solution to the refinement equation is that there exists a positive integer A such that (see Z-transform):

$$(1+Z)^A | a(Z):=a_0+a_1Z+\dots+a_{N-1}Z^{N-1}.$$

The maximally possible power A is called polynomial approximation order (or pol. app. power) or number of vanishing moments. It describes the ability to represent polynomials up to degree A-1 with linear combinations of integer translates of the scaling function.

In the biorthogonal case, an approximation order A of $\phi$ corresponds to A vanishing moments of the dual wavelet $\tilde\psi$, that is, the scalar products of $\tilde\psi$ with any polynomial up to degree A-1 are zero. In the opposite direction, the approximation order Ã of $\tilde\phi$ is equivalent to Ã vanishing moments of $\psi$. In the orthogonal case, A and Ã coincide.

A sufficient condition for the existence of a scaling function is the following: if one decomposes $a(Z)=2^{1-A}(1+Z)^Ap(Z)$, and the estimate

$$1\le\sup_{t\in[0,2\pi]} \left |p(e^{it}) \right |<2^{A-1-n},$$

holds for some $n\in\N$, then the refinement equation has a n times continuously differentiable solution with compact support.

=== Examples ===
- Suppose $p(Z) =1$ then $a(Z)=2^{1-A}(1+Z)^A$, and the estimate holds for n=A-2. The solutions are Schoenbergs B-splines of order A-1, where the (A-1)-th derivative is piecewise constant, thus the (A-2)-th derivative is Lipschitz-continuous. A=1 corresponds to the index function of the unit interval.
- A=2 and p linear may be written as

$$a(Z)=\frac14(1+Z)^2((1+Z)+c(1-Z)).$$

Expansion of this degree 3 polynomial and insertion of the 4 coefficients into the orthogonality condition results in $c^2=3.$ The positive root gives the scaling sequence of the D4-wavelet, see below.
