= Continuous wavelet =

Functions used by the continuous wavelet transform

In numerical analysis, continuous wavelets are functions used by the continuous wavelet transform. These functions are defined as analytical expressions, as functions either of time or of frequency. Most of the continuous wavelets are used for both wavelet decomposition and composition transforms. That is they are the continuous counterpart of orthogonal wavelets.

The following continuous wavelets have been invented for various applications:

- Poisson wavelet
- Morlet wavelet
- Modified Morlet wavelet
- Mexican hat wavelet
- Complex Mexican hat wavelet
- Shannon wavelet
- Meyer wavelet
- Difference of Gaussians
- Hermitian wavelet
- Beta wavelet
- Causal wavelet
- μ wavelets
- Cauchy wavelet
- Addison wavelet

== See also ==
- Wavelet
