= Centre International de Rencontres Mathématiques =

Mathematics research institute in France

Coordinates: 43.229965°N 5.442937°E

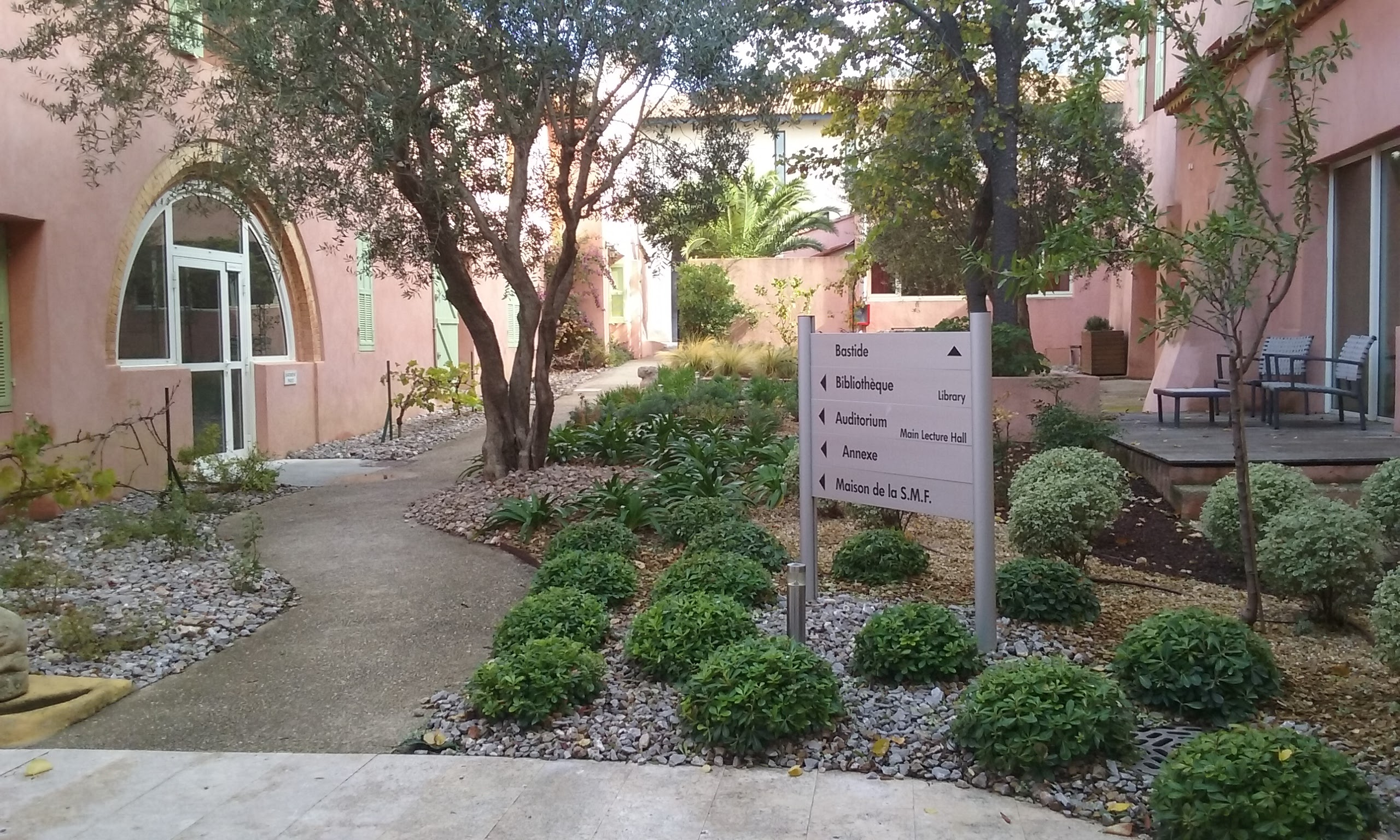
Atrium in the main building at the Centre International de Rencontres Mathématiques in Luminy, Marseille, France.

The Centre International de Rencontres Mathématiques (CIRM) is a mathematics research institute associated with the Centre National de la Recherche Scientifique (CNRS) and the Société Mathématique de France (SMF). It is located in Luminy, Marseille, France, and is affiliated with Aix-Marseille University. CIRM hosts weekly workshops on diverse topics where mathematicians and scientists from all over the world come to do collaborative research. Modeled as a "villa Medici of mathematics", it receives around 3,500 visitors per year.

== History ==
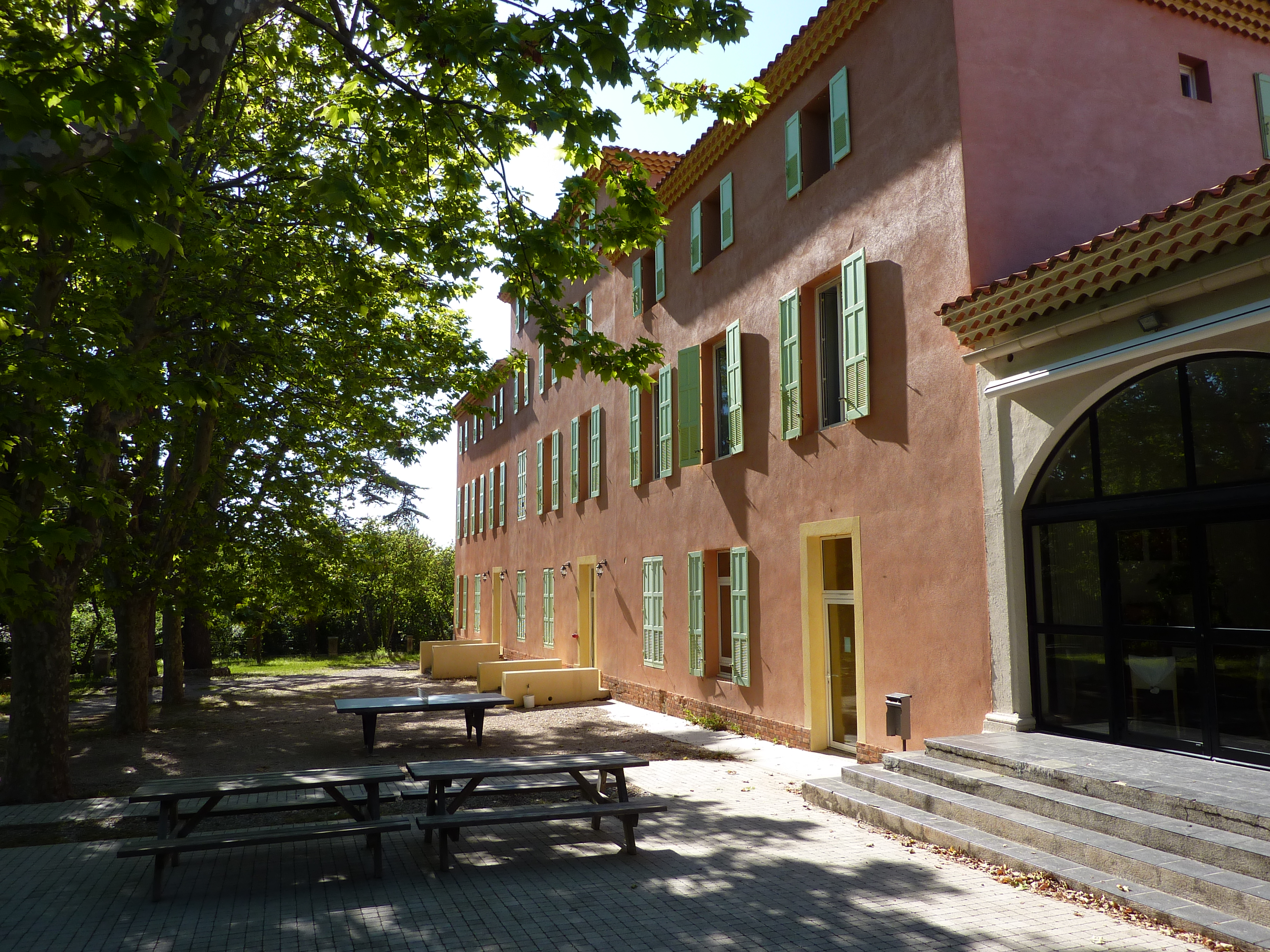
CIRM Luminy residential hall

In 1954, a report from the CNRS discussed potential sites for a meeting place to hold international seminars and workshops in mathematics similar to the Mathematisches Forschunginstitut Oberwolfach. The Luminy estate, formerly owned by the prominent Fabre shipping family, was chosen in 1976. The estate was handed over to the SMF in 1979. The center opened in 1981 and the first workshop was held in 1982.

== Scientific programs ==
CIRM supports a variety of residential programs and workshops. Each year, CIRM runs around 35 week-long workshops with an average of 75 weekly participants. CIRM also supports joint programs with Société de Mathématiques Appliquées et Industrielles, Institut Henri Poincaré, and Société Mathématique de France.

=== Jean-Morlet Chair ===
CIRM hosts the Jean-Morlet Chair, which is a six-month residential program for international researchers to collaborate with a local project leader from Aix-Marseille University to plan events and projects. The chair was named after Jean Morlet, a French geophysicist who worked with Marseille-based researcher Alex Grossmann, among others, to develop the wavelet transform. Past chairs have included Nicola Kistler, Boris Hasselblatt, Igor Shparlinski, Hans Georg Feichtinger, Herwig Hauser, François Lalonde, Dipendra Prasad, Mariusz Lemańczyk, Konstantin Khanin, Shigeki Akiyama, and Genevieve Walsh.

== Directors ==
- André Aragnol: June 1981 – August 1986
- Gilles Lachaud: September 1986 – August 1991
- Jean-Paul Brasselet: September 1991 – August 1995
- Jean-Pierre Labesse: September 1995 – August 2000
- Robert Coquereaux: September 2000 – August 2005
- Pascal Chossat: September 2005 – August 2010
- Patrick Foulon: September 2010 – August 2020
- Pascal Hubert: September 2020 – present
