= Fbsp wavelet =

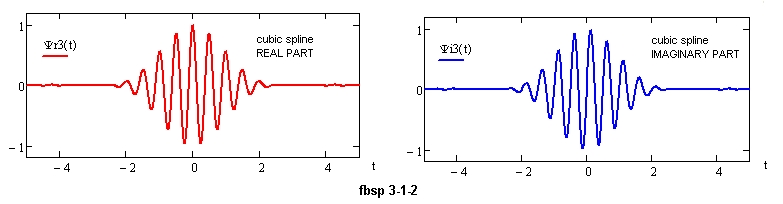
Frequency B-spline wavelets: cubic spline fbsp 3-1-2 complex wavelet.

In applied mathematics, fbsp wavelets are frequency B-spline wavelets.

These frequency B-spline wavelets are complex wavelets whose spectrum are spline.

$$\operatorname{fbsp}^{(m-\mathrm{fb}-f_c) }(t) := {\sqrt {\mathrm{fb}}} \operatorname{sinc}^m \left( \frac {t} {\mathrm{fb}^m} \right) e^{j2 \pi f_c t}$$

where sinc function that appears in Shannon sampling theorem.

- m > 1 is the order of the spline
- fb is a bandwidth parameter
- f_{c} is the wavelet center frequency

The Shannon wavelet (sinc wavelet) is then clearly a special case of fbsp.
