= Victor Wickerhauser =

Croatian American mathematician

Mladen Victor Wickerhauser was born in Zagreb, SR Croatia, in 1959. He is a graduate of the California Institute of Technology and Yale University.

He is currently a professor of Mathematics in the Arts and Sciences at Washington University in St. Louis and of Biomedical Engineering in the McKelvey School of Engineering at Washington University in St. Louis. He has six U.S. patents and more than 100 publications. One of these, "Entropy-based Algorithms for Best Basis Selection," led to the Wavelet Scalar Quantization (WSQ) image compression algorithm, used by the FBI to encode fingerprint images.

Wickerhauser has been a member of the American Mathematical Society and the Society for Industrial and Applied Mathematics and has received the 2002 Wavelet Pioneer Award from SPIE.

== Selected works ==
- Adapted Wavelet Analysis from Theory to Software (A K Peters, 1994) ISBN 1-56881-041-5
- Mathematics for Multimedia (Elsevier 2003, ISBN 0-12-748451-5) (Birkhaeuser 2009, ISBN 978-0-8176-4879-4)
- Introducing Financial Mathematics: Theory, Binomial Models, and Applications (Chapman and Hall/CRC 2023) ISBN 978-1-0323-5985-4
