= Wavelet scalar quantization =

Compression algorithm used for gray-scale fingerprint images

The Wavelet Scalar Quantization algorithm (WSQ) is a compression algorithm used for gray-scale fingerprint images. It is based on wavelet theory and has become a standard for the exchange and storage of fingerprint images. WSQ was developed by the FBI, the Los Alamos National Laboratory, and the National Institute of Standards and Technology (NIST).

This compression method is preferred over standard compression algorithms like JPEG because at the same compression ratios WSQ doesn't present the "blocking artifacts" and loss of fine-scale features that are not acceptable for identification in financial environments and criminal justice.

Most American law enforcement agencies use WSQ for efficient storage of compressed fingerprint images at 500 pixels per inch (ppi). For fingerprints recorded at 1000 ppi, law enforcement (including the FBI) uses JPEG 2000 instead of WSQ.

== See also ==
- IAFIS
