= Jean Morlet =

French geophysicist

- Born: 13 January 1931
- Died: 27 April 2007 (aged 76)
- Education: École Polytechnique
- Known for: Wavelet theory Morlet wavelet
- Scientific career
- Fields: Geophysics; Applied mathematics

Jean Morlet (French: [ʒɑ̃ mɔʁlɛ]; 13 January 1931 – 27 April 2007) was a French geophysicist who pioneered work in the field of wavelet analysis around the year 1975. He invented the term wavelet to describe the functions he was using. In 1981, Morlet worked with Alex Grossmann to develop what is now known as the Wavelet transform.

== Biography ==
Morlet studied at École Polytechnique from 1952 to 1955 and was research engineer at Elf Aquitaine when he invented wavelets to solve signal processing problems for oil prospecting.

== Awards ==
He was awarded in 1997 with the Reginald Fessenden Award. He was awarded in 2001 with the first prize Prix Chéreau Lavet, from the Académie des Technologies.

== Legacy ==
The Jean-Morlet Chair at the Centre International de Rencontres Mathématiques is named in his honor.
