= Ali Akansu =

Turkish-American mathematician (born 1958)

Ali Naci Akansu
- Born: May 6, 1958; İnegöl, Bursa, Turkey
- Education: Istanbul Technical University, Polytechnic University (now NYU Tandon School of Engineering)
- Known for: Binomial QMF (Daubechies wavelet), Eigen filter bank, Modified Hermite Transformation
- Awards: IEEE Fellow (2008)
- Scientific career
- Fields: Electrical Engineering, Applied Mathematics
- Workplaces: New Jersey Institute of Technology

Ali Naci Akansu (born May 6, 1958) is a Turkish-American professor of electrical & computer engineering and scientist in applied mathematics.

He is best known for his contributions to the theory and applications of linear subspace methods including sub-band and wavelet transforms, particularly the binomial QMF (also known as Daubechies wavelet) and the multivariate framework to design statistically optimized filter bank (eigen filter bank).

== Biography ==
Akansu received his B.S. degree from the Istanbul Technical University, Turkey, in 1980, his M.S. and PhD degrees from the Polytechnic University (now New York University), Brooklyn, New York, in 1983 and 1987, respectively, all in Electrical Engineering. Since 1987, he has been with the New Jersey Institute of Technology where he is a Professor of Electrical and Computer Engineering. He was a visiting professor at Courant Institute of Mathematical Sciences of the New York University, 2009–2010.

In 1990, he showed that the binomial quadrature mirror filter bank (binomial QMF) is identical to the Daubechies wavelet filter, and interpreted and evaluated its performance from a discrete-time signal processing perspective. It was an extension of his prior work on Binomial coefficient and Hermite polynomials that he developed the Modified Hermite Transformation (MHT) in 1987. The magnitude square functions of Binomial-QMF filters were shown to be the unique maximally flat functions in a two-band PR-QMF design formulation. He organized the first wavelet conference in the United States at NJIT in April 1990, and, then in 1992 and 1994. Together with Richard A. Haddad, he published the first wavelet-related engineering book in the literature entitled Multiresolution Signal Decomposition: Transforms, Subbands and Wavelets in 1992.

He made contributions in the areas of optimal filter banks, nonlinear phase extensions of discrete Walsh-Hadamard transform and discrete Fourier transform, principal component analysis of first-order autoregressive process, sparse approximation, digital watermarking, financial signal processing and quantitative finance.

Akansu was a founding director of the New Jersey Center for Multimedia Research (NJCMR), 1996–2000, and NSF Industry-University Cooperative Research Center (IUCRC) for Digital Video, 1998–2000. He was the vice president for research and development of the IDT Corporation, 2000–2001, the founding president and CEO of PixWave, Inc. (an IDT Entertainment subsidiary) that has built the technology for secure peer-to-peer video distribution over the Internet. He was an academic visitor at David Sarnoff Research Center (Sarnoff Corporation), at IBM's Thomas J. Watson Research Center, and at Marconi Electronic Systems.

He is an IEEE Fellow (since 2008) with the citation for contributions to optimal design of transforms and filter banks for communications and multimedia security.

According to the Mathematics Genealogy Project, as of October 2023, Akansu had a total of 25 doctorate students.

== Selected works ==
- Akansu, Ali N.; Haddad, Richard A. (1992), Multiresolution Signal Decomposition: Transforms, Subbands, and Wavelets, Boston, MA: Academic Press, ISBN 978-0-12-047141-6
- Akansu, Ali N.; Smith, Mark J. T. (1996), Subband and Wavelet Transforms: Design and Applications, Boston: Kluwer Academic Publishers, ISBN 978-0-7923-9645-1
- Akansu, Ali N.; Medley, Michael J. (1999), Wavelet, Subband, and Block Transforms in Communications and Multimedia, Boston: Kluwer Academic Publishers, ISBN 978-0-7923-8507-3
- Sencar, Husrev T.; Mahalingam Ramkumar; Akansu, Ali N. (2004), Data Hiding Fundamentals and Applications: Content Security in Digital Multimedia, Boston, MA: Academic Press, ISBN 978-0-12-047144-7
- Akansu, Ali N.; Torun, Mustafa U. (2015), A Primer for Financial Engineering: Financial Signal Processing and Electronic Trading, Boston, MA: Academic Press, ISBN 978-0-12-801561-2
- Akansu, Ali N.; Kulkarni, Sanjeev R.; Malioutov, Dmitry M. (2016), Financial Signal Processing and Machine Learning, Hoboken, NJ: Wiley-IEEE Press, ISBN 978-1-118-74567-0
