= Complex Mexican hat wavelet =

In applied mathematics, the complex Mexican hat wavelet is a low-oscillation, complex-valued, wavelet for the continuous wavelet transform. This wavelet is formulated in terms of its Fourier transform as the Hilbert analytic signal of the conventional Mexican hat wavelet:

$$\hat{\Psi}(\omega) = \begin{cases}
2\sqrt{\frac{2}{3}}\pi^{-\frac{1}{4}}\omega^2 e^{-\frac{1}{2}\omega^2} & \omega\geq0 \\
0 & \omega\leq 0.
\end{cases}$$

Temporally, this wavelet can be expressed in terms of the error function, as:

$$\Psi(t) = \frac{2}{\sqrt{3}}\pi^{-\frac{1}{4}}\left(\sqrt{\pi}\left(1 - t^2\right)e^{-\frac{1}{2}t^2} - \left(\sqrt{2}it + \sqrt{\pi}\operatorname{erf}\left[\frac{i}{\sqrt{2}}t\right]\left(1 - t^2\right)e^{-\frac{1}{2}t^2}\right)\right).$$

This wavelet has $O\left(|t|^{-3}\right)$ asymptotic temporal decay in $|\Psi(t)|$, dominated by the discontinuity of the second derivative of $\hat{\Psi}(\omega)$ at $\omega = 0$.

This wavelet was proposed in 2002 by Addison et al. for applications requiring high temporal precision time-frequency analysis.
