= Symlet =

In applied mathematics, symlet wavelets are a family of wavelets. They are a modified version of Daubechies wavelets with increased symmetry.
