= Modified Morlet wavelet =

Modified Mexican hat, Modified Morlet and Dark soliton or Darklet wavelets are derived from hyperbolic (sech) (bright soliton) and hyperbolic tangent (tanh) (dark soliton) pulses. These functions are derived intuitively from the solutions of the nonlinear Schrödinger equation in the anomalous and normal dispersion regimes in a similar fashion to the way that the Morlet and the Mexican hat are derived. The modified Morlet is defined as: $\psi_2(t)=C_{\psi_2}\cos(\omega_0 t){\rm sech}(t)$
