= Ricker wavelet =

Wavelet proportional to the second derivative of a Gaussian

Mexican hat

In mathematics and numerical analysis, the Ricker wavelet, Mexican hat wavelet, or Marr wavelet (for David Marr)

$$\psi(t) = \frac{2}{\sqrt{3\sigma}\pi^{1/4}} \left(1 - \left(\frac{t}{\sigma}\right)^2 \right) e^{-\frac{t^2}{2\sigma^2}}$$

is the negative normalized $\left(\int_{\mathbb{R}}\psi^2=1\right)$ second derivative of a Gaussian function, i.e., up to scale and normalization, the second Hermite function. It is a special case of the family of continuous wavelets (wavelets used in a continuous wavelet transform) known as Hermitian wavelets. The Ricker wavelet is frequently employed to model seismic data and as a broad-spectrum source term in computational electrodynamics.

The Ricker wavelet has two vanishing moments,

$$\int_{-\infty}^{\infty} \psi(t)\,dt = 0,
\qquad
\int_{-\infty}^{\infty} t\,\psi(t)\,dt = 0,$$

and is therefore insensitive to any linear trends $y=ax + b$ in the analyzed signal.

The 2-dimensional generalization

$$\psi(x,y) = \frac{1}{\pi\sigma^4}\left(1-\frac{1}{2} \left(\frac{x^2+y^2}{\sigma^2}\right)\right) e^{-\frac{x^2+y^2}{2\sigma^2}}$$

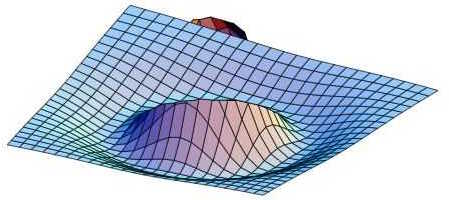
3D view of 2D Mexican hat wavelet

of this wavelet is called the Laplacian of Gaussian function. In practice, this wavelet is sometimes approximated by the difference of Gaussians (DoG) function, because the DoG is separable. It can therefore save considerable computation time in two or more dimensions. The scale-normalized Laplacian (in $L_1$-norm) is frequently used as a blob detector and for automatic scale selection in computer vision applications; see Laplacian of Gaussian and scale space. The relation between this Laplacian of the Gaussian operator and the difference-of-Gaussians operator is explained in appendix A in Lindeberg (2015). Derivatives of cardinal B-splines can also approximate the Mexican hat wavelet.

== Frequency domain ==
a)

b)

Linear (а) and logarithmic (b) normalized magnitude of the Ricker wavelet frequency response.

Since Ricker wavelet is, up to a scaling factor, the second derivative of a Gaussian function, according to the properties of the Fourier transform, its spectrum is equal to the spectrum of a Gaussian function multiplied by the square of the frequency. The spectrum of a Gaussian function with a given parameter σ is a Gaussian function with parameter $\omega=1/\sigma$. Thus, the wavelet spectrum has the shape

$$\hat{\psi}(\omega)
\propto
\omega^2
\exp\left(-\frac{\sigma^2\omega^2}{2}\right).$$

The $w^2$ term is responsible for suppressing low frequencies, while the Gaussian term is responsible for suppressing high frequencies. Thus, the Ricker wavelet acts as a band-pass filter with a peak transmission frequency $\omega_p=\frac{\sqrt{2}}{\sigma}$. The frequency band for half amplitude transmission level is $\omega_{min}\approx0.48\omega_p$, $\omega_{max}\approx1.64\omega_p$, its width $\Delta\omega_{\frac12 A} \approx1.16\omega_p$.

== See also ==
- Morlet wavelet
