= Strömberg wavelet =

Mathematic orthonornal wavelet

In mathematics, the Strömberg wavelet is a certain orthonormal wavelet discovered by Jan-Olov Strömberg and presented in a paper published in 1983. Even though the Haar wavelet was earlier known to be an orthonormal wavelet, Strömberg wavelet was the first smooth orthonormal wavelet to be discovered. The term wavelet had not been coined at the time of publishing the discovery of Strömberg wavelet and Strömberg's motivation was to find an orthonormal basis for the Hardy spaces.

== Definition ==
Let m be any non-negative integer. Let V be any discrete subset of the set R of real numbers. Then V splits R into non-overlapping intervals. For any r in V, let I_{r} denote the interval determined by V with r as the left endpoint. Let P^{(m)}(V) denote the set of all functions f(t) over R satisfying the following conditions:

- f(t) is square integrable.
- f(t) has continuous derivatives of all orders up to m.
- f(t) is a polynomial of degree m + 1 in each of the intervals I_{r}.

If A_{0} = {. . . , -2, -3/2, -1, -1/2} ∪ {0} ∪ {1, 2, 3, . . .} and A_{1} = A_{0} ∪ { 1/2 } then the Strömberg wavelet of order m is a function S^{m}(t) satisfying the following conditions:

- $S^m(t)\in P^{(m)} (A_1).$
- $\Vert S^m(t)\Vert=1$, that is, $\int_R\vert S^m(t)\vert^2\, dt = 1.$
- $S^m(t)$ is orthogonal to $P^{(m)}(A_0)$, that is, $\int_R S^m(t)\, f(t)\, dt=0$ for all $f(t)\in P^{(m)}(A_0).$

=== Properties of the set P^{(m)}(V) ===
The following are some of the properties of the set P^{(m)}(V):

1. Let the number of distinct elements in V be two. Then f(t) ∈ P^{(m)}(V) if and only if f(t) = 0 for all t.
2. If the number of elements in V is three or more than P^{(m)}(V) contains nonzero functions.
3. If V_{1} and V_{2} are discrete subsets of R such that V_{1} ⊂ V_{2} then P^{(m)}(V_{1}) ⊂ P^{(m)}(V_{2}). In particular, P^{(m)}(A_{0}) ⊂ P^{(m)}(A_{1}).
4. If f(t) ∈ P^{(m)}(A_{1}) then f(t) = g(t) + α λ(t) where α is constant and g(t) ∈ P^{(m)}(A_{0}) is defined by g(r) = f(r) for r ∈ A_{0}.

=== Strömberg wavelet as an orthonormal wavelet ===
The following result establishes the Strömberg wavelet as an orthonormal wavelet.

=== Theorem ===
Let S^{m} be the Strömberg wavelet of order m. Then the following set

$$\left\{2^{j/2}S^m(2^jt-k):j,k \text{ integers }\right\}$$

is a complete orthonormal system in the space of square integrable functions over R.

== Strömberg wavelets of order 0 ==
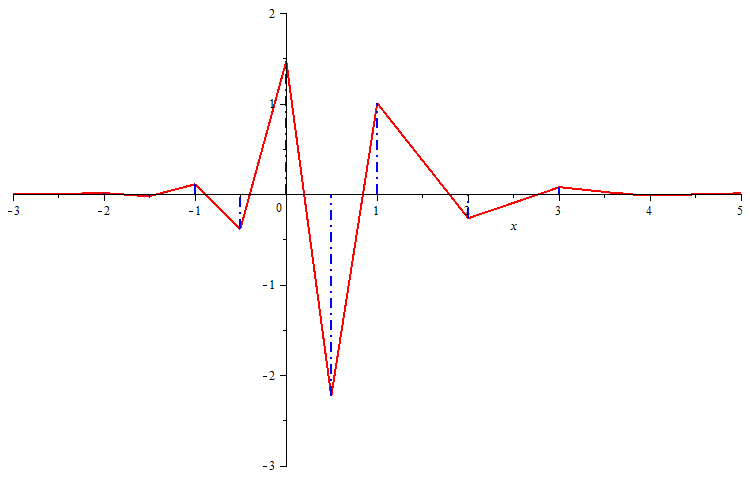
The graph of the Strömberg wavelet of order 0. The graph is scaled such that the value of the wavelet function at 1 is 1.

In the special case of Strömberg wavelets of order 0, the following facts may be observed:

1. If f(t) ∈ P^{0}(V) then f(t) is defined uniquely by the discrete subset {f(r) : r ∈ V} of R.
2. To each s ∈ A_{0}, a special function λ_{s} in A_{0} is associated: It is defined by λ_{s}(r) = 1 if r = s and λ_{s}(r) = 0 if s ≠ r ∈ A_{0}. These special elements in P(A_{0}) are called simple tents. The special simple tent λ_{1/2}(t) is denoted by λ(t)

=== Computation of the Strömberg wavelet of order 0 ===
As already observed, the Strömberg wavelet S^{0}(t) is completely determined by the set { S^{0}(r) : r ∈ A_{1} }. Using the defining properties of the Strömbeg wavelet, exact expressions for elements of this set can be computed and they are given below.

$S^0(k) = S^0(1)(\sqrt{3}-2)^{k-1}$ for $k=1,2,3, \ldots$
$$S^0(\tfrac{1}{2})  =  -S^0(1)\left(\sqrt{3}+\tfrac{1}{2}\right)$$
$$S^0(0) = S^0(1)(2\sqrt{3}-2)$$
$S^0(-\tfrac{k}{2}) = S^0(1)(2\sqrt{3}-2)(\sqrt{3}-2)^k$ for $k=1,2,3, \ldots$

Here S^{0}(1) is constant such that ||S^{0}(t)|| = 1.

=== Some additional information about Strömberg wavelet of order 0 ===
The Strömberg wavelet of order 0 has the following properties.

- The Strömberg wavelet S^{0}(t) oscillates about t-axis.
- The Strömberg wavelet S^{0}(t) has exponential decay.
- The values of S^{0}(t) for positive integral values of t and for negative half-integral values of t are related as follows: $S^0(-k/2)=(10-6\sqrt{3})S^0(k)$ for $k=1,2,3,\ldots\,.$
