= Shannon wavelet =

In functional analysis, the Shannon wavelet (or sinc wavelets) is a decomposition that is defined by signal analysis by ideal bandpass filters. Shannon wavelet may be either of real or complex type.

Shannon wavelet is not well-localized (noncompact) in the time domain, but its Fourier transform is band-limited (compact support). Hence Shannon wavelet has poor time localization but has good frequency localization. These characteristics are in stark contrast to those of the Haar wavelet. The Haar and sinc systems are Fourier duals of each other.

== Definition ==
Sinc function is the starting point for the definition of the Shannon wavelet.

=== Scaling function ===
First, we define the scaling function to be the sinc function.

$\phi^{\text{(Sha)}}(t) := \frac {\sin \pi t} {\pi t} = \operatorname{sinc}(t).$

And define the dilated and translated instances to be

$\phi^n_k(t) := 2^{n/2}\phi^{\text{(Sha)}}(2^n t-k)$

where the parameter $n,k$ means the dilation and the translation for the wavelet respectively.

Then we can derive the Fourier transform of the scaling function:

$$\Phi^{\text{(Sha)}}(\omega) = \frac{1}{2\pi}\Pi(\frac{\omega}{2\pi})
=
\begin{cases}
\frac{1}{2\pi}, & \mbox{if } {|\omega| \le \pi}, \\
0 & \mbox{if } \mbox{otherwise}. \\
\end{cases}$$
where the (normalised) gate function is defined by

$$\Pi ( x):=
\begin{cases}
1, & \mbox{if } {|x| \le 1/2}, \\
0 & \mbox{if } \mbox{otherwise}. \\
\end{cases}$$
Also for the dilated and translated instances of scaling function: $\Phi^n_k(\omega) = \frac{2^{-n/2}}{2\pi}e^{-i\omega(k+1)/2^n}\Pi(\frac{\omega}{2^{n+1}\pi})$

=== Mother wavelet ===
Use $\Phi^{\text{(Sha)}}$ and multiresolution approximation we can derive the Fourier transform of the Mother wavelet:

$\Psi^{\text{(Sha)}}(\omega) = \frac{1}{2\pi}e^{-i\omega} \bigg(\Pi(\frac{\omega}{\pi}-\frac{3}{2})+\Pi(\frac{\omega}{\pi}+\frac{3}{2})\bigg)$

And the dilated and translated instances:

$\Psi^n_k(\omega) = \frac{2^{-n/2}}{2\pi}e^{-i\omega(k+1)/2^n} \bigg(\Pi(\frac{\omega}{2^n\pi}-\frac{3}{2})+\Pi(\frac{\omega}{2^n\pi}+\frac{3}{2})\bigg)$

Then the shannon mother wavelet function and the family of dilated and translated instances can be obtained by the inverse Fourier transform:

$\psi^{\text{(Sha)}}(t) = \frac{\sin\pi(t-(1/2))-\sin2\pi(t-(1/2))}{\pi(t-1/2)} =\operatorname{sinc}\bigg(t-\frac{1}{2}\bigg)-2\operatorname{sinc}\bigg(2(t-\frac{1}{2})\bigg)$

$\psi^n_k(t) = 2^{n/2}\psi^{\text{(Sha)}}(2^nt-k)$

=== Property of mother wavelet and scaling function ===
- Mother wavelets are orthonormal, namely,

$$<\psi^n_k(t), \psi^m_h(t)>=\delta^{nm}\delta_{hk}=
\begin{cases} 1, & \text{if }h=k \text{ and } n=m\\ 0, & \text{otherwise} \end{cases}$$

- The translated instances of scaling function at level $n=0$ are orthogonal

$<\phi^0_k(t), \phi^0_h(t)>=\delta^{kh}$

- The translated instances of scaling function at level $n=0$ are orthogonal to the mother wavelets

$<\phi^0_k(t), \psi^m_h(t)>=0$

- Shannon wavelets has an infinite number of vanishing moments.

== Reconstruction of a Function by Shannon Wavelets ==
Suppose $f(x)\in L_2(\mathbb{R})$ such that $\operatorname{supp}\operatorname{FT}\{f\}\subset[-\pi,\pi]$ and for any dilation and the translation parameter $n,k$,

$\Bigg|\int^\infty_{-\infty}f(t)\phi^0_k(t)dt\Bigg|<\infty$, $\Bigg|\int^\infty_{-\infty}f(t)\psi^n_k(t)dt\Bigg|<\infty$

Then

$f(t)=\sum^\infty_{k=\infty}\alpha_k\phi^0_k(t)$ is uniformly convergent, where $\alpha_k=f(k)$

== Real Shannon wavelet ==
Real Shannon wavelet

The Fourier transform of the Shannon mother wavelet is given by:

$$\Psi^{(\operatorname{Sha}) }(w) = \prod \left( \frac {w- 3 \pi /2} {\pi}\right)+\prod \left( \frac {w+ 3 \pi /2} {\pi}\right).$$

where the (normalised) gate function is defined by

$$\prod ( x):=
\begin{cases}
1, & \mbox{if } {|x| \le 1/2}, \\
0 & \mbox{if } \mbox{otherwise}. \\
\end{cases}$$

The analytical expression of the real Shannon wavelet can be found by taking the inverse Fourier transform:

$$\psi^{(\operatorname{Sha}) }(t) = \operatorname{sinc} \left( \frac {t} {2}\right)\cdot \cos \left( \frac {3 \pi t} {2}\right)$$

or alternatively as

$$\psi^{(\operatorname{Sha})}(t)=2 \cdot \operatorname{sinc}(2t)-\operatorname{sinc}(t),$$

where

$$\operatorname{sinc}(t):= \frac {\sin {\pi t}} {\pi t}$$

is the usual sinc function that appears in Shannon sampling theorem.

This wavelet belongs to the $C^\infty$-class of differentiability, but it decreases slowly at infinity and has no bounded support, since band-limited signals cannot be time-limited.

The scaling function for the Shannon MRA (or Sinc-MRA) is given by the sample function:

$$\phi^{(Sha)}(t)= \frac {\sin \pi t} {\pi t} = \operatorname{sinc}(t).$$

== Complex Shannon wavelet ==
In the case of complex continuous wavelet, the Shannon wavelet is defined by

$$\psi^{(CSha) }(t)=\operatorname{sinc}(t) \cdot e^{-2\pi i t}$$,
