= Alex Grossmann =

Croatian-French physicist (1930–2019)

Alexander Grossmann (5 August 1930 – 12 February 2019) was a French-American physicist of Croatian origin.

== Early life ==
Aleksandar Grossmann was born to a Jewish family in Zagreb, where he was attending a gymnasium when World War II in Yugoslavia started. Forced to flee the so-called Independent State of Croatia in April 1941, he and his family settled in Rijeka in Italy-occupied Croatia, then in Montecatini Terme in Italy, and finally Switzerland. After the war, he returned to Zagreb and completed high school as well as graduated mathematics at the Faculty of Science, University of Zagreb in 1952.

== Career ==
Grossmann started work at the Ruđer Bošković Institute, and collaborated with international visiting scholars between 1952 and 1955.

He travelled to the United States in 1955, working in the physics departments of the Institute for Advanced Study (IAS) in Princeton, Brandeis University, and the Courant Institute, NYU, then again at the IAS until 1963.

After one year at the Institut des Hautes Études Scientifiques (IHES) in Bures-sur-Yvette, France, he joined the "Centre de Physique Théorique de Marseille" (the CPT) as it was being created in 1966, at the request of Daniel Kastler. He then became a research supervisor at the CNRS.

At the Université de la Méditerranée Aix-Marseille II in Luminy campus he did pioneering work on wavelet analysis with Jean Morlet in 1984. This in effect showed this identity's applicability to signal analysis.

In 1993, he became involved in genomic research as part of a group formed in Gif-sur-Yvette. He worked in this area with what eventually became the Laboratoire de Mathématique & Modélisation d'Evry until 2014.

== Tributes ==
Grossmann's lifelong scientific achievements were commemorated at a scientific conference held in his honor and that of Yves Meyer on 12-13 June 2019 at the Institut de Mathématiques d'Orsay.

== Publications ==
- Description of the Extended Tube (1960)
- Algebraic Characterization of the TCP Operation (1960)
- Schrödinger Scattering Amplitude (I) (1961)
- Schrödinger Scattering Amplitude (II) (1961)
- Schrödinger Scattering Amplitude (III) (1962)
- Nested Hilbert Spaces in Quantum Mechanics (I) (1964)
- Fields at a Point (1967)
- A class of explicitly soluble, local, many-center Hamiltonians for one-particle quantum mechanics in two and three dimensions (I) (1980)
- The one particle theory of periodic point interactions (1980)
- Fermi pseudopotential in higher dimensions (1981)
- Class of potentials with extremely narrow resonances. I. Case with discrete rotational symmetry
- Decomposition of Hardy Functions into Square Integrable Wavelets of Constant Shape (1984)
- Use of Wavelet transform in the Study of Propagation of Transient Acoustic Signals Across a Plane Interface Between Two Homogeneous Media (1984)
- Wavelets on Discrete Fields Kristin Flornes, Alex Grossmann, Matthias Holschneider, Bruno Torrésani Applied and Computational Harmonic Analysis (1994)
- Proceeding: Perspectives in Mathematical Physics, International Conference in honor of Alex Grossmann (1997)
- On the Analysis of Pairwise Alignments of Protein Sequences (1998)
- Transition Rate Matrices Determined By Families of Alignments Give Information About Evolution (1999)
- Rate Matrices for Analyzing Large Families of Protein Sequences (2001)
- Constructing Hierarchical Set Systems (2003)
- Rate matrices for analyzing large families of protein sequences (2004)
- Variable length local decoding and alignment-free sequence comparison (2012)
