= Morlet wavelet =

Gaussian-windowed wavelet

Real-valued Morlet wavelet

Complex-valued Morlet wavelet

In mathematics, the Morlet wavelet (or Gabor wavelet) is a wavelet composed of a complex exponential (carrier) multiplied by a Gaussian window (envelope). This wavelet is closely related to human perception, both hearing and vision.

== History ==
In 1946, physicist Dennis Gabor, applying ideas from quantum physics, introduced the use of Gaussian-windowed sinusoids for time-frequency decomposition, which he referred to as atoms, and which provide the best trade-off between spatial and frequency resolution. These are used in the Gabor transform, a type of short-time Fourier transform. In 1984, Jean Morlet introduced Gabor's work to the seismology community and, with Goupillaud and Grossmann, modified it to keep the same wavelet shape over equal octave intervals, resulting in the first formalization of the continuous wavelet transform.

== Definition ==
The wavelet is defined as a constant $\kappa_{\sigma}$ subtracted from a plane wave and then localised by a Gaussian window:

$$\Psi_{\sigma}(t)=c_{\sigma}\pi^{-\frac{1}{4}}e^{-\frac{1}{2}t^{2}}(e^{i\sigma t}-\kappa_{\sigma})$$

where $\kappa_{\sigma}=e^{-\frac{1}{2}\sigma^{2}}$ is defined by the admissibility criterion, and the normalisation constant $c_{\sigma}$ is:

$$c_{\sigma}=\left(1+e^{-\sigma^{2}}-2e^{-\frac{3}{4}\sigma^{2}}\right)^{-\frac{1}{2}}$$

The Fourier transform of the Morlet wavelet is:

$$\hat{\Psi}_{\sigma}(\omega) = c_\sigma \pi^{-\frac{1}{4}} \left( e^{-\frac{1}{2}(\sigma-\omega)^2} - \kappa_\sigma e^{-\frac{1}{2}\omega^{2}} \right)$$

The "central frequency" $\omega_{\Psi}$ is the position of the global maximum of $\hat{\Psi}_{\sigma}(\omega)$ which, in this case, is given by the positive solution to:

$\omega_{\Psi} = \sigma \frac{1}{1 - e^{-\sigma \omega_{\Psi}}}$

which can be solved by a fixed-point iteration starting at $\omega_{\Psi} = \sigma$ (the fixed-point iterations converge to the unique positive solution for any initial $\omega_{\Psi}>0$).

The parameter $\sigma$ in the Morlet wavelet allows trade between time and frequency resolutions. Conventionally, the restriction $\sigma>5$ is used to avoid problems with the Morlet wavelet at low $\sigma$ (high temporal resolution).

For signals containing only slowly varying frequency and amplitude modulations (audio, for example) it is not necessary to use small values of $\sigma$. In this case, $\kappa_{\sigma}$ becomes very small (e.g. $\sigma>5 \quad \Rightarrow \quad \kappa_{\sigma}<10^{-5}\,$) and is, therefore, often neglected. Under the restriction $\sigma>5$, the frequency of the Morlet wavelet is conventionally taken to be $\omega_{\Psi}\simeq\sigma$.

The wavelet exists as a complex version or a purely real-valued version. Some distinguish between the "real Morlet" vs the "complex Morlet". Others consider the complex version to be the "Gabor wavelet", while the real-valued version is the "Morlet wavelet".

== Uses ==
=== Use in medicine ===
In magnetic resonance spectroscopy imaging, the Morlet wavelet transform method offers an intuitive bridge between frequency and time information which can clarify the interpretation of complex head trauma spectra obtained with Fourier transform. The Morlet wavelet transform, however, is not intended as a replacement for the Fourier transform, but rather a supplement that allows qualitative access to time related changes and takes advantage of the multiple dimensions available in a free induction decay analysis.

The application of the Morlet wavelet analysis is also used to discriminate abnormal heartbeat behavior in the electrocardiogram (ECG). Since the variation of the abnormal heartbeat is a non-stationary signal, this signal is suitable for wavelet-based analysis.

=== Use in music ===
The Morlet wavelet transform is used in pitch estimation and can produce more accurate results than Fourier transform techniques. The Morlet wavelet transform is capable of capturing short bursts of repeating and alternating music notes with a clear start and end time for each note.

A modified morlet wavelet was proposed to extract melody from polyphonic music. This methodology is designed for the detection of closed frequency. The Morlet wavelet transform is able to capture music notes and the relationship of scale and frequency is represented as the follow:

$$f_{a}={f_{c} \over a \times T}$$

where $f_{a}$ is the pseudo frequency to scale $a$, $f_{c}$ is the center frequency and $T$ is the sampling time.

Morlet wavelet is modified as described as:

$$\Psi(t)= e^{-|{t \over k }|} \cos(2 \pi t)$$

and its Fourier transformation:

$$F[ \Psi(t)]= {1 \over {4 \pi^{2} f^{2} +1 } } [ \delta(f-2 \pi)+ \delta(f+2 \pi)]$$

== Application ==
- Signals with time-varying frequencies is a common characteristic in rotating machinery faults, making Morlet wavelet a suitable approach to perform the analysis. By adapting the Morlet wavelet, the system can enhance its ability to capture subtle variations and abnormalities in the machinery signals that may indicate faults. The adaptability of the Morlet wavelet provides a robust method of preprocessing the input signals, therefore ensuring that the system can effectively handle the varying frequencies associated with different fault conditions.
- By treating the Morlet wavelet as a neural network, the researchers aim to enhance the sensitivity and accuracy of HIV prevention measures. The neural network, based on the Morlet wavelet, is designed to recognize intricate patterns indicative of potential HIV risks or vulnerabilities. The adaptability of the Morlet wavelet-based neural network and its integration with existing strategies mark a significant step forward in the ongoing efforts to combat the HIV epidemic.
- The Morlet wavelet, known for its versatility in analyzing signals and its adaptability to nonlinear systems, serves as a key component in corneal system associated with eye surgery. Traditional numerical methods may struggle to capture the intricacies of such systems, making innovative approaches necessary. The Morlet wavelet artificial neural network emerges as a promising tool due to its ability to effectively handle nonlinearities and provide accurate numerical solutions.
- Researchers leveraged the Morlet wavelet transform to extract meaningful features from ultra-wideband (UWB) positioning system signals, taking advantage of its efficacy in preserving temporal and spectral characteristics. This transformative step in preprocessing lays the foundation for robust line-of-sight (LOS) / non-line-of-sight (NLOS) classification. Morlet wavelet has superiority over conventional methods in capturing intricate signal features, contributing significantly to the overall success of the LOS / NLOS identification system.
- By combining Morlet wavelet filtering with phase analysis, it is able to improve the signal-to-noise ratio and subsequently reduce the limit of detection (LOD) of thin film optical biosensors. The Morlet wavelet filtering process involves transforming the sensor's output signal into the frequency domain. By convolving the signal with the Morlet wavelet, which is a complex sinusoidal wave with a Gaussian envelope, the technique allows for the extraction of relevant frequency components from the signal. This process is particularly advantageous for analyzing signals with non-stationary and time-varying characteristics, making it well-suited for biosensing applications where the target analyte concentrations may vary over time.

== See also ==
- Constant-Q transform
- Gabor wavelet
