= Generalized spectrogram =

Generalized application of spectrograms

A generalized spectrogram, also called "two-window spectrogram", is a generalized application of spectrograms. In order to view a signal (taken to be a function of time) represented over both time and frequency axes, a time–frequency representation is used. Spectrograms are one of the most popular time-frequency representations.

== Definition ==
The definition of the spectrogram relies on the Gabor transform (also called short-time Fourier transform, for short STFT), whose idea is to localize a signal f in time by multiplying it with translations of a window function $w(t)$.

The definition of spectrogram is

$$S{P_{x,w}}(t,f) = {G_{x,w}}(t,f)G_{_{x,w}}^*(t,f)=|{G_{x,w}}(t,f)|^2$$,

where ${G_{x,{w_1}}}$ denotes the Gabor Transform of $x(t)$.

Based on the spectrogram, the generalized spectrogram is defined as:

$$S{P_{x,{w_1},{w_2}}}(t,f) = {G_{x,{w_1}}}(t,f)G_{_{x,{w_2}}}^*(t,f)$$,

where:

$${G_{x,{w_1}}}\left( {t,f} \right) = \int_{ - \infty }^\infty  {{w_1}\left( {t - \tau } \right)x\left( \tau  \right)\,{e^{ - j2\pi \,f\,\tau }}d\tau }$$
$${G_{x,{w_2}}}\left( {t,f} \right) = \int_{ - \infty }^\infty  {{w_2}\left( {t - \tau } \right)x\left( \tau  \right)\,{e^{ - j2\pi \,f\,\tau }}d\tau }$$

For $w_1(t) = w_2(t)=w(t)$, it reduces to the classical spectrogram:

$$S{P_{x,w}}(t,f) = {G_{x,w}}(t,f)G_{_{x,w}}^*(t,f)=|{G_{x,w}}(t,f)|^2$$

The feature of Generalized spectrogram is that the window sizes of $w_1(t)$ and $w_2(t)$ are different. Since the time-frequency resolution will be affected by the window size, if one choose a wide $w_1(t)$ and a narrow $w_1(t)$ (or the opposite), the resolutions of them will be high in different part of spectrogram. After the multiplication of these two Gabor transform, the resolutions of both time and frequency axis will be enhanced.

== Properties ==
Relation with Wigner Distribution
$$\mathcal{SP}_{w_1,w_2}(t,f)(x,w) = Wig (w_1', w_2')*Wig (t,f)(x, w),$$
where $w_1'(s):=w_1(-s), w_2'(s):=w_2(-s)$
Time marginal condition
The generalized spectrogram $\mathcal{SP}_{w_1,w_2}(t,f)(x,w)$ satisfies the time marginal condition if and only if $w_1w_2' = \delta$,
where $\delta$ denotes the Dirac delta function
Frequency marginal condition
The generalized spectrogram $\mathcal{SP}_{w_1,w_2}(t,f)(x,w)$ satisfies the frequency marginal condition if and only if $w_1w_2' = \delta$,
where $\delta$ denotes the Dirac delta function
Conservation of energy
The generalized spectrogram $\mathcal{SP}_{w_1,w_2}(t,f)(x,w)$ satisfies the conservation of energy if and only if $(w_1,w_2) = 1$.
Reality analysis
The generalized spectrogram $\mathcal{SP}_{w_1,w_2}(t,f)(x,w)$ is real if and only if $w_1=C w_2$ for some $C\in \R$.
