= Rectangular mask short-time Fourier transform =

In mathematics and Fourier analysis, a rectangular mask short-time Fourier transform (rec-STFT) is a simplified form of the short-time Fourier transform which is used to analyze how a signal's frequency content changes over time. In rec-STFT, a rectangular window (a simple on/off time-limiting function) is used to isolate short time segments of the signal. Other types of the STFT may require more computation time (refers to the amount of time it takes a computer or algorithm to perform a calculation or complete a task) than the rec-STFT.

The rectangular mask function can be defined for some bound (B) over time (t) as

$$w(t) =\begin{cases}
\ 1; & |t|\leq B \\
\ 0; & |t|>B
\end{cases}$$

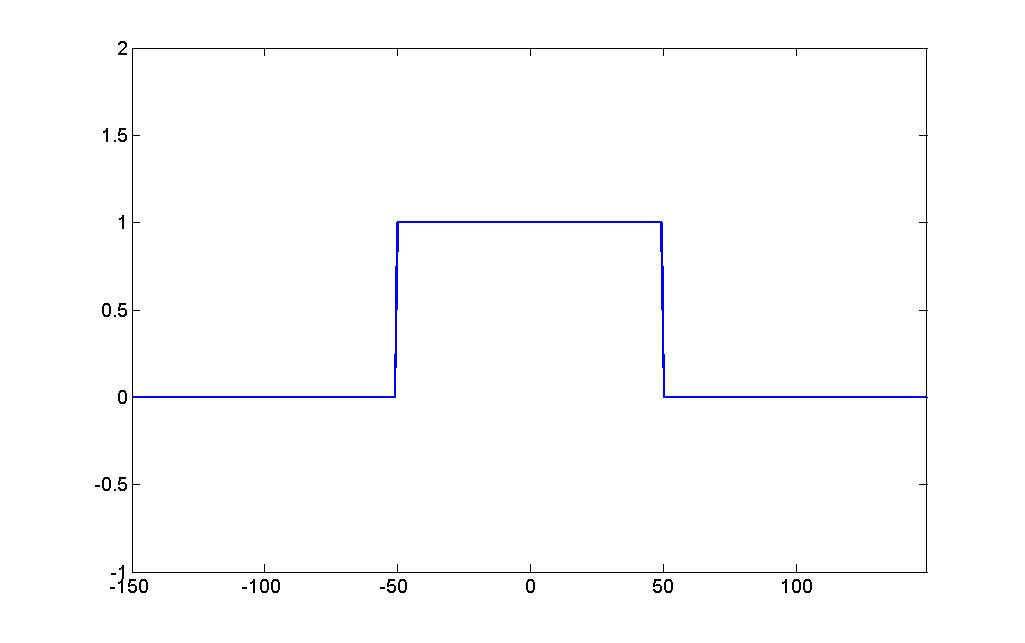
B = 50, x-axis (sec)

We can change B for different tradeoffs between desired time resolution and frequency resolution.

Rec-STFT

$$X(t,f)=\int_{t-B}^{t+B} x(\tau) e^{-j2\pi f\tau} \, d\tau$$

Inverse form

$$x(t)=\int_{-\infty}^\infty X(t_1,f)e^{j2\pi ft} \, df\text{ where } t-B<t_1<t+B$$

== Property ==
Rec-STFT has similar properties with Fourier transform

- Integration

(a)

$$\int_{-\infty}^\infty X(t, f)\, df = \int_{t-B}^{t+B} x(\tau)\int_{-\infty}^\infty e^{-j 2 \pi f \tau}\, df \, d\tau = \int_{t-B}^{t+B} x(\tau)\delta(\tau) \, d\tau=\begin{cases}
\ x(0); & |t|< B \\
\ 0; & \text{otherwise}
\end{cases}$$

(b)

$$\int_{-\infty}^\infty X(t, f)e^{-j 2 \pi f v} \,df =\begin{cases}
\ x(v); & v-B<t< v+B \\
\ 0; & \text{otherwise}
\end{cases}$$

- Shifting property (shift along x-axis)

$$\int_{t-B}^{t+B} x(\tau+\tau_0) e^{-j 2 \pi f \tau}\, d\tau = X(t+\tau_0,f)e^{j 2 \pi f \tau_0}$$

- Modulation property (shift along y-axis)

$$\int_{t-B}^{t+B} [x(\tau) e^{j 2 \pi f_0 \tau}] d\tau = X(t,f-f_0)$$

- special input
1. When
  $$x(t)=\delta(t), X(t,f)=\begin{cases}
\ 1; & |t|< B \\
\ 0; & \text{otherwise}
\end{cases}$$
2. When $x(t)=1,X(t,f)=2B\operatorname{sinc}(2Bf)e^{j 2 \pi f t}$
- Linearity property

If $h(t)=\alpha x(t)+\beta y(t) \,$,$H(t,f), X(t,f),$and $Y(t,f) \,$are their rec-STFTs, then

$$H(t,f)=\alpha X(t,f)+\beta Y(t,f) .$$

- Power integration property

$$\int_{-\infty}^\infty |X(t, f)|^2\, df = \int_{t-B}^{t+B} |x(\tau)|^2\,d\tau$$
$$\int_{-\infty}^\infty \int_{-\infty}^\infty |X(t, f)|^2\,df\,dt = 2B \int_{-\infty}^\infty |x(\tau)|^2\,d\tau$$

- Energy sum property (Parseval's theorem)

$$\int_{-\infty}^\infty X(t,f)Y^*(t,f)\,df =  \int_{t-B}^{t+B} x(\tau)y^*(\tau)\,d\tau$$
$$\int_{-\infty}^\infty \int_{-\infty}^{\infty}X(t,f)Y^*(t,f)\,df\,dt =2B \int_{-\infty}^\infty x(\tau)y^*(\tau)\,d\tau$$

== Example of tradeoff with different B ==
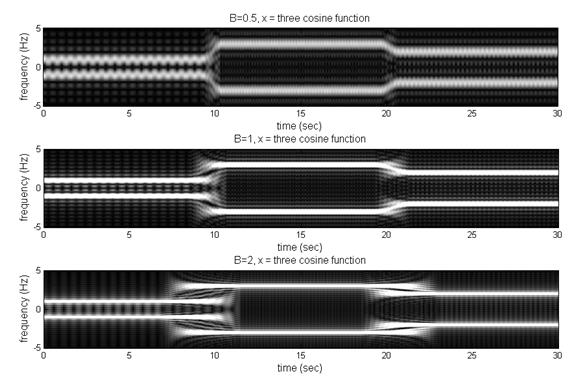
Spectrograms produced from applying a rec-STFT on a function consisting of 3 consecutive cosine waves. (top spectrogram uses smaller B of 0.5, middle uses B of 1, and bottom uses larger B of 2.)

From the image, when B is smaller, the time resolution is better. Otherwise, when B is larger, the frequency resolution is better.

== Advantage and disadvantage ==
Compared with the Fourier transform:

- Advantage: The instantaneous frequency can be observed.
- Disadvantage: Higher complexity of computation.

Compared with other types of time-frequency analysis:

- Advantage: Least computation time for digital implementation.
- Disadvantage: Quality is worse than other types of time-frequency analysis. The jump discontinuity of the edges of the rectangular mask results in Gibbs ringing artifacts in the frequency domain, which can be alleviated with smoother windows.

== See also ==
- Uncertainty principle
