= Fractional Fourier transform =

Mathematical operation

In mathematics, in the area of harmonic analysis, the fractional Fourier transform (FRFT) is a family of linear transformations generalizing the Fourier transform. It can be thought of as the Fourier transform to the nth power, where n need not be an integer – thus, it can transform a function to any intermediate domain between time and frequency. Its applications range from filter design and signal analysis to phase retrieval and pattern recognition.

The FRFT can be used to define fractional convolution, correlation, and other operations, and can also be further generalized into the linear canonical transformation (LCT). An early definition of the FRFT was introduced by Condon, by solving for the Green's function for phase-space rotations, and also by Namias, generalizing work of Wiener on Hermite polynomials.

However, it was not widely recognized in signal processing until it was independently reintroduced around 1993 by several groups. Since then, there has been a surge of interest in extending Shannon's sampling theorem for signals which are band-limited in the Fractional Fourier domain.

A completely different meaning for "fractional Fourier transform" was introduced by Bailey and Swartztrauber as essentially another name for a z-transform, and in particular for the case that corresponds to a discrete Fourier transform shifted by a fractional amount in frequency space (multiplying the input by a linear chirp) and evaluating at a fractional set of frequency points (e.g. considering only a small portion of the spectrum). (Such transforms can be evaluated efficiently by Bluestein's FFT algorithm.) This terminology has fallen out of use in most of the technical literature, however, in preference to the FRFT. The remainder of this article describes the FRFT.

== Introduction ==
The continuous Fourier transform $\mathcal{F}$ of a function $f: \mathbb{R} \mapsto \mathbb{C}$ is a unitary operator of $L^2$ space that maps the function $f$ to its frequential version $\hat{f}$ (all expressions are taken in the $L^2$ sense, rather than pointwise):
$$\hat{f}(\xi) = \int_{-\infty}^{\infty} f(x)\ e^{- 2\pi i x \xi}\,\mathrm{d}x$$
and $f$ is determined by $\hat{f}$ via the inverse transform $\mathcal{F}^{-1}$,
$$f(x) = \int_{-\infty}^{\infty} \hat{f}(\xi)\ e^{2 \pi i \xi x}\,\mathrm{d}\xi\, .$$

Let us study its $n$th iterated $\mathcal{F}^{n}$ defined by $\mathcal{F}^{n}[f] = \mathcal{F}[\mathcal{F}^{n-1}[f]]$ and $\mathcal{F}^{-n} = (\mathcal{F}^{-1})^n$ when $n$ is a non-negative integer, and $\mathcal{F}^{0}[f] = f$. Their sequence is finite since $\mathcal{F}$ is a 4-periodic automorphism: for every function $f$, $\mathcal{F}^4 [f] = f$.

More precisely, let us introduce the parity operator $\mathcal{P}$ that inverts $x$, $\mathcal{P}[f] : x \mapsto f(-x)$. Then the following properties hold:
$$\mathcal{F}^0 = \mathrm{Id}, \qquad \mathcal{F}^1 = \mathcal{F}, \qquad \mathcal{F}^2 = \mathcal{P}, \qquad \mathcal{F}^4 = \mathrm{Id}$$
$$\mathcal{F}^3 = \mathcal{F}^{-1} = \mathcal{P} \circ \mathcal{F} = \mathcal{F} \circ \mathcal{P}.$$

The FRFT provides a family of linear transforms that further extends this definition to handle non-integer powers $n = 2\alpha/\pi$ of the FT.

== Definition ==
Note: some authors write the transform in terms of the "order a" instead of the "angle α", in which case the α is usually a times π/2. Although these two forms are equivalent, one must be careful about which definition the author uses.

For any real α, the α-angle fractional Fourier transform of a function ƒ is denoted by $\mathcal{F}_\alpha (u)$ and defined by:

$\mathcal{F}_\alpha[f](u) = \sqrt{1-i\cot(\alpha)} e^{i \pi \cot(\alpha) u^2} \int_{-\infty}^\infty e^{-2\pi i\left(\csc(\alpha) u x - \frac{\cot(\alpha)}{2} x^2\right)} f(x)\, \mathrm{d}x$

For α = π/2, this becomes precisely the definition of the continuous Fourier transform, and for α = −π/2 it is the definition of the inverse continuous Fourier transform.

The FRFT argument u is neither a spatial one x nor a frequency ξ. We will see why it can be interpreted as linear combination of both coordinates (x, ξ). When we want to distinguish the α-angular fractional domain, we will let $x_a$ denote the argument of $\mathcal{F}_\alpha$.

Remark: with the angular frequency ω convention instead of the frequency one, the FRFT formula is the Mehler kernel,
$$\mathcal{F}_\alpha(f)(\omega) =
\sqrt{\frac{1-i\cot(\alpha)}{2\pi}}
e^{i \cot(\alpha) \omega^2/2}
\int_{-\infty}^\infty
e^{-i\csc(\alpha) \omega t + i \cot(\alpha) t^2/2}
f(t)\, dt~.$$

=== Properties ===
The αth order fractional Fourier transform operator, $\mathcal{F}_\alpha$, has the properties:

==== Additivity ====
For any real angles α, β,
$$\mathcal{F}_{\alpha+\beta} = \mathcal{F}_\alpha \circ \mathcal{F}_\beta = \mathcal{F}_\beta \circ \mathcal{F}_\alpha.$$

==== Linearity ====
$$\mathcal{F}_\alpha \left [\sum\nolimits_k b_kf_k(u)  \right ]=\sum\nolimits_k b_k\mathcal{F}_\alpha \left [f_k(u) \right ]$$

==== Integer Orders ====
If $\alpha$ is an integer multiple of $\pi / 2$, then:
$$\mathcal{F}_\alpha = \mathcal{F}_{k\pi/2} = \mathcal{F}^k = (\mathcal{F})^k$$

Moreover, it has following relation
$$\begin{align}
\mathcal{F}^2 &= \mathcal{P} && \mathcal{P}[f(u)]=f(-u)\\
\mathcal{F}^3 &= \mathcal{F}^{-1} = (\mathcal{F})^{-1} \\
\mathcal{F}^4 &= \mathcal{F}^0 = \mathcal{I} \\
\mathcal{F}^i &= \mathcal{F}^j && i \equiv j \mod 4
\end{align}$$

==== Inverse ====
$$(\mathcal{F}_\alpha)^{-1}=\mathcal{F}_{-\alpha}$$

==== Commutativity ====
$$\mathcal{F}_{\alpha_1}\mathcal{F}_{\alpha_2}=\mathcal{F}_{\alpha_2}\mathcal{F}_{\alpha_1}$$

==== Associativity ====
$$\left (\mathcal{F}_{\alpha_1}\mathcal{F}_{\alpha_2} \right )\mathcal{F}_{\alpha_3} = \mathcal{F}_{\alpha_1} \left (\mathcal{F}_{\alpha_2}\mathcal{F}_{\alpha_3} \right )$$

==== Unitarity ====
$$\int f(t)g^*(t)dt=\int f_\alpha(u)g_\alpha^*(u)du$$

==== Time Reversal ====
$$\mathcal{F}_\alpha\mathcal{P}=\mathcal{P}\mathcal{F}_\alpha$$
$$\mathcal{F}_\alpha[f(-u)]=f_\alpha(-u)$$

==== Transform of a shifted function ====
Define the shift and the phase shift operators as follows:
$$\begin{align}
\mathcal{SH}(u_0)[f(u)] &= f(u+u_0) \\
\mathcal{PH}(v_0)[f(u)] &= e^{j2\pi v_0u}f(u)
\end{align}$$

Then
$$\begin{align}
\mathcal{F}_\alpha \mathcal{SH}(u_0) &= e^{j\pi u_0^2 \sin\alpha \cos\alpha} \mathcal{PH}(u_0\sin\alpha) \mathcal{SH}(u_0\cos\alpha) \mathcal{F}_\alpha,
\end{align}$$
that is,
$$\begin{align}
\mathcal{F}_\alpha [f(u+u_0)] &=e^{j\pi u_0^2 \sin\alpha \cos\alpha}  e^{j2\pi uu_0 \sin\alpha} f_\alpha (u+u_0 \cos\alpha)
\end{align}$$

==== Transform of a scaled function ====
Define the scaling and chirp multiplication operators as follows:
$$\begin{align}
M(M)[f(u)] &= |M|^{-\frac{1}{2}} f \left (\tfrac{u}{M} \right) \\
Q(q)[f(u)] &= e^{-j\pi qu^2 } f(u)
\end{align}$$

Then,
$$\begin{align}
\mathcal{F}_\alpha  M(M) &= Q \left (-\cot \left (\frac{1-\cos^2 \alpha'}{\cos^2 \alpha}\alpha \right ) \right)\times M \left (\frac{\sin \alpha}{M\sin \alpha'} \right )\mathcal{F}_{\alpha'} \\ [6pt]
\mathcal{F}_\alpha \left [|M|^{-\frac{1}{2}} f \left (\tfrac{u}{M} \right)  \right ] &= \sqrt{\frac{1-j \cot\alpha}{1-jM^2  \cot\alpha}} e^{j\pi u^2\cot \left (\frac{1-\cos^2 \alpha'}{\cos^2 \alpha}\alpha \right )} \times f_a \left (\frac{Mu \sin\alpha'}{\sin\alpha} \right )
\end{align}$$

Notice that the fractional Fourier transform of $f(u/M)$ cannot be expressed as a scaled version of $f_\alpha (u)$. Rather, the fractional Fourier transform of $f(u/M)$ turns out to be a scaled and chirp modulated version of $f_{\alpha'}(u)$ where $\alpha\neq\alpha'$ is a different order.

=== Fractional kernel ===
The FRFT is an integral transform
$$\mathcal{F}_\alpha f (u) = \int K_\alpha (u, x) f(x)\, \mathrm{d}x$$
where the α-angle kernel is
$$K_\alpha (u, x) = \begin{cases}\sqrt{1-i\cot(\alpha)} \exp \left(i \pi (\cot(\alpha)(x^2+ u^2) -2 \csc(\alpha) u x) \right) & \mbox{if } \alpha \mbox{ is not a multiple of }\pi, \\
\delta (u - x) & \mbox{if } \alpha \mbox{ is a multiple of } 2\pi, \\
\delta (u + x) & \mbox{if } \alpha+\pi \mbox{ is a multiple of } 2\pi, \\
\end{cases}$$

Here again the special cases are consistent with the limit behavior when α approaches a multiple of π.

The FRFT has the same properties as its kernels :

- symmetry: $K_\alpha~(u, u')=K_\alpha ~(u', u)$
- inverse: $K_\alpha^{-1} (u, u') = K_\alpha^* (u, u') = K_{-\alpha} (u', u)$
- additivity: $K_{\alpha+\beta} (u,u') = \int K_\alpha (u, u'') K_\beta (u'', u')\,\mathrm{d}u''.$

=== Related transforms ===
There also exist related fractional generalizations of similar transforms such as the discrete Fourier transform.

- The discrete fractional Fourier transform is defined by Zeev Zalevsky. A quantum algorithm to implement a version of the discrete fractional Fourier transform in sub-polynomial time is described by Somma.
- The Fractional wavelet transform (FRWT) is a generalization of the classical wavelet transform in the fractional Fourier transform domains.
- The chirplet transform for a related generalization of the wavelet transform.

=== Generalizations ===
The Fourier transform is essentially bosonic; it works because it is consistent with the superposition principle and related interference patterns. There is also a fermionic Fourier transform. These have been generalized into a supersymmetric FRFT, and a supersymmetric Radon transform. There is also a fractional Radon transform, a symplectic FRFT, and a symplectic wavelet transform. Because quantum circuits are based on unitary operations, they are useful for computing integral transforms as the latter are unitary operators on a function space. A quantum circuit has been designed which implements the FRFT. Attempts were made to perform the fractional Fourier transform using confluent Vandermonde matrix.

== Interpretation ==
=== Time-frequency analysis ===
A rect function turns into a sinc function as the order of the fractional Fourier transform becomes 1

The usual interpretation of the Fourier transform is as a transformation of a time domain signal into a frequency domain signal. On the other hand, the interpretation of the inverse Fourier transform is as a transformation of a frequency domain signal into a time domain signal. Fractional Fourier transforms transform a signal (either in the time domain or frequency domain) into the domain between time and frequency: it is a rotation in the time–frequency domain. This perspective is generalized by the linear canonical transformation, which generalizes the fractional Fourier transform and allows linear transforms of the time–frequency domain other than rotation.

Take the figure below as an example. If the signal in the time domain is rectangular (as below), it becomes a sinc function in the frequency domain. But if one applies the fractional Fourier transform to the rectangular signal, the transformation output will be in the domain between time and frequency.

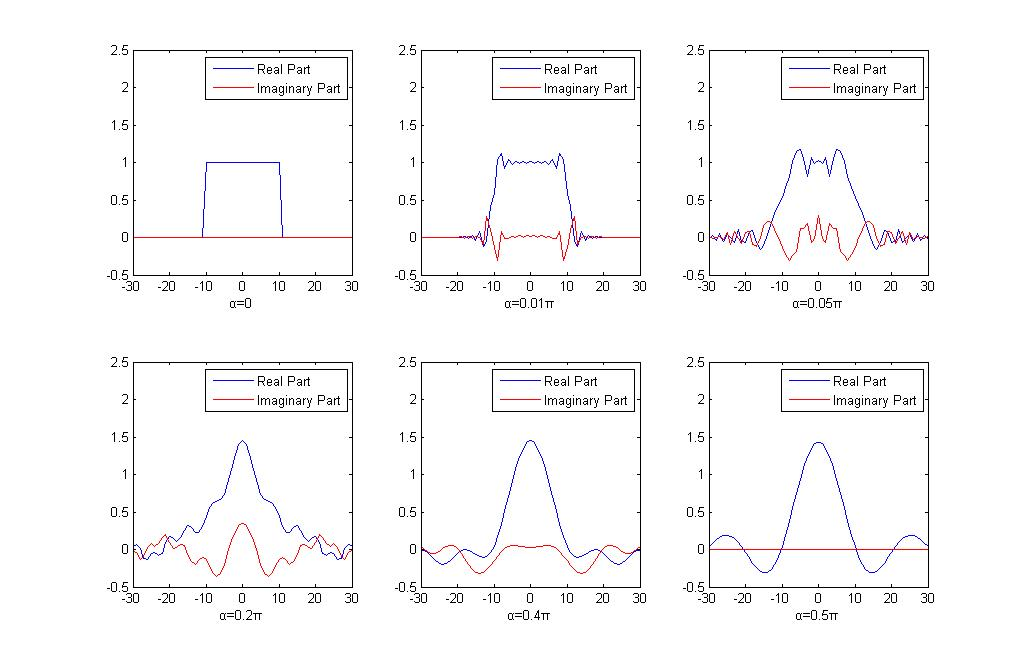
Fractional Fourier transform

The fractional Fourier transform is a rotation operation on a time–frequency distribution. From the definition above, for α = 0, there will be no change after applying the fractional Fourier transform, while for α = π/2, the fractional Fourier transform becomes a plain Fourier transform, which rotates the time–frequency distribution with π/2. For other value of α, the fractional Fourier transform rotates the time–frequency distribution according to α. The following figure shows the results of the fractional Fourier transform with different values of α.

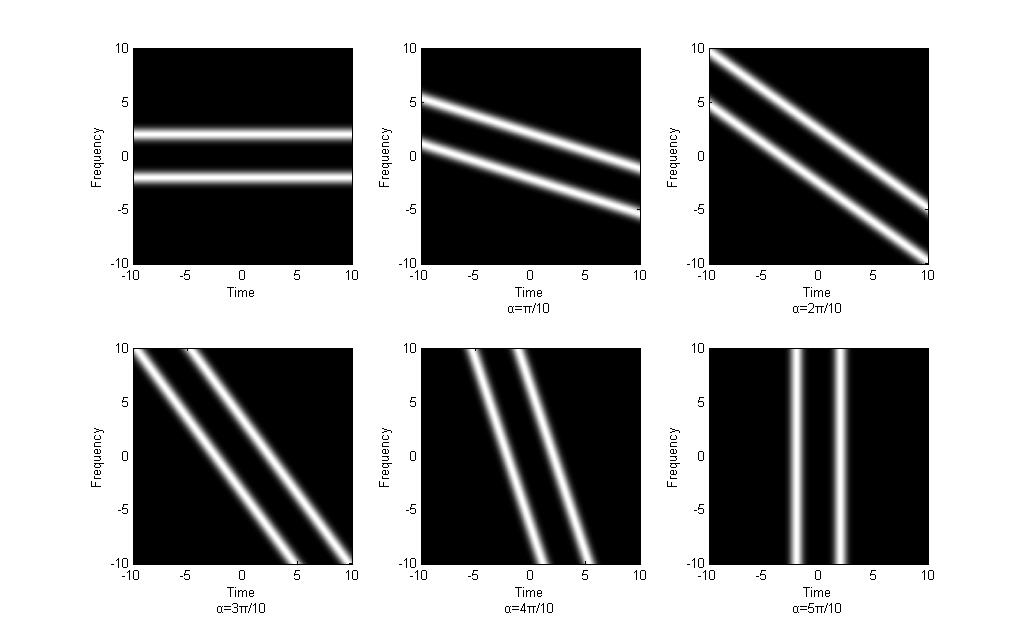
Time/frequency distribution of fractional Fourier transform

=== Fresnel and Fraunhofer diffraction ===
The diffraction of light can be calculated using integral transforms. The Fresnel diffraction integral is used to find the near field diffraction pattern. In the far-field limit this equation becomes a Fourier transform to give the equation for Fraunhofer diffraction. The fractional Fourier transform is equivalent to the Fresnel diffraction equation. When the angle $\alpha$ becomes $\pi/2$, the fractional Fourier transform is the standard Fourier transform and gives the far-field diffraction pattern. The near-field diffraction maps to values of $\alpha$ between $0$ and $\pi/2$.

== Application ==
Fractional Fourier transform can be used in time frequency analysis and DSP. It is useful to filter noise, but with the condition that it does not overlap with the desired signal in the time–frequency domain. Consider the following example. We cannot apply a filter directly to eliminate the noise, but with the help of the fractional Fourier transform, we can rotate the signal (including the desired signal and noise) first. We then apply a specific filter, which will allow only the desired signal to pass. Thus the noise will be removed completely. Then we use the fractional Fourier transform again to rotate the signal back and we can get the desired signal.

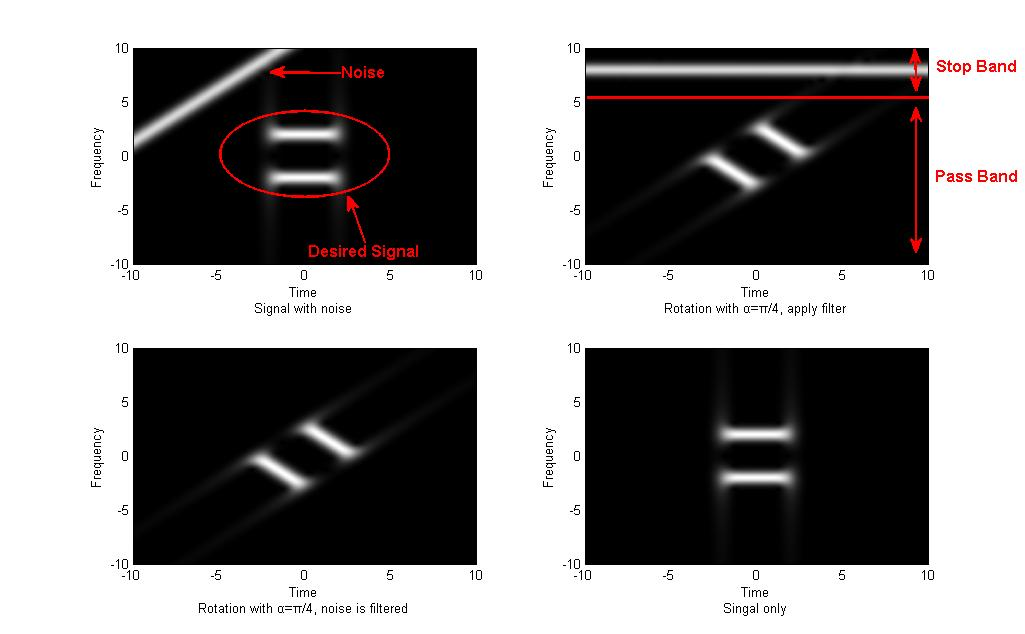
Fractional Fourier transform in DSP

Thus, using just truncation in the time domain, or equivalently low-pass filters in the frequency domain, one can cut out any convex set in time–frequency space. In contrast, using time domain or frequency domain tools without a fractional Fourier transform would only allow cutting out rectangles parallel to the axes.

Fractional Fourier transforms also have applications in quantum physics. For example, they are used to formulate entropic uncertainty relations, in high-dimensional quantum key distribution schemes with single photons, and in observing spatial entanglement of photon pairs.

They are also useful in the design of optical systems and for optimizing holographic storage efficiency. More recent works have demonstrated the use of fractional Fourier transform in the longstanding problem of phase retrieval.

== See also ==
- Least-squares spectral analysis
- Fractional calculus
- Mehler kernel

Other time–frequency transforms:

- Linear canonical transformation
- Short-time Fourier transform
- Wavelet transform
- Chirplet transform
- Cone-shape distribution function
- Quadratic Fourier transform
- Chirp Z-transform

== Bibliography ==
- Candan, C.; Kutay, M. A.; Ozaktas, H. M. (May 2000). "The discrete fractional Fourier transform" (PDF). IEEE Transactions on Signal Processing. 48 (5): 1329–1337. Bibcode:2000ITSP...48.1329C. doi:10.1109/78.839980. hdl:11693/11130.
- Ding, Jian-Jiun (2007). Time frequency analysis and wavelet transform (Class notes). Taipei, Taiwan: Department of Electrical Engineering, National Taiwan University (NTU).
- Lohmann, A. W. (1993). "Image rotation, Wigner rotation and the fractional Fourier transform". J. Opt. Soc. Am. A (10): 2181–2186. Bibcode:1993JOSAA..10.2181L. doi:10.1364/JOSAA.10.002181.
- Ozaktas, Haldun M.; Zalevsky, Zeev; Kutay, M. Alper (2001). The Fractional Fourier Transform with Applications in Optics and Signal Processing. Series in Pure and Applied Optics. John Wiley & Sons. ISBN 978-0-471-96346-2.
- Pei, Soo-Chang; Ding, Jian-Jiun (2001). "Relations between fractional operations and time–frequency distributions, and their applications". IEEE Trans. Signal Process. 49 (8): 1638–1655. Bibcode:2001ITSP...49.1638P. doi:10.1109/78.934134.
- Saxena, Rajiv; Singh, Kulbir (January–February 2005). "Fractional Fourier transform: A novel tool for signal processing" (PDF). J. Indian Inst. Sci. 85: 11–26. Archived from the original (PDF) on 16 July 2011.
