= Chirplet transform =

Transform in signal processing

Comparison of wave, wavelet, chirp, and chirplet

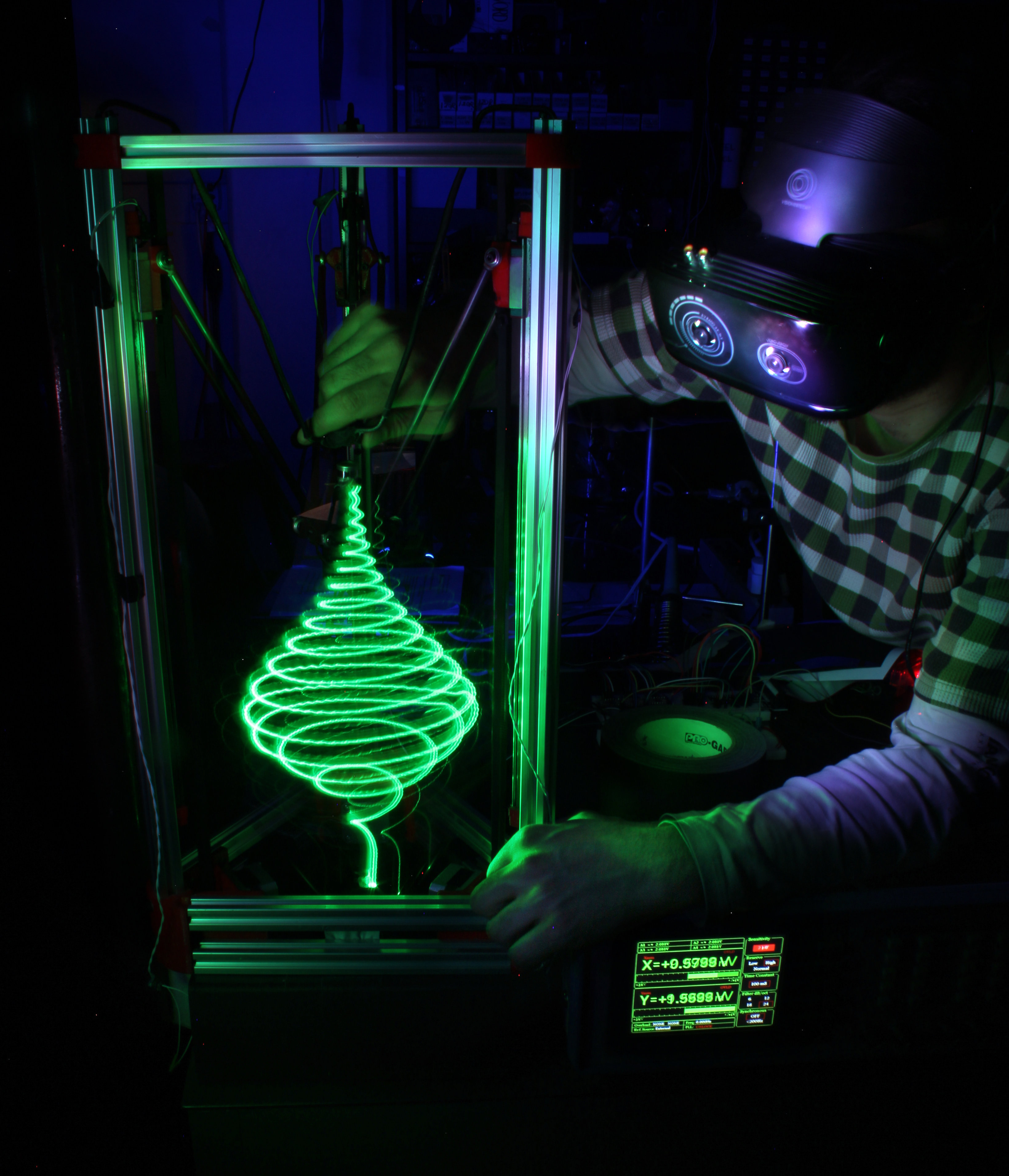
Chirplet in a computer-mediated reality environment.

In signal processing, the chirplet transform is an inner product of an input signal with a family of analysis primitives called chirplets.

Similar to the wavelet transform, chirplets are usually generated from (or can be expressed as being from) a single mother chirplet (analogous to the so-called mother wavelet of wavelet theory).

== Definitions ==
The term chirplet transform was coined by Steve Mann, as the title of the first published paper on chirplets. The term chirplet itself (apart from chirplet transform) was also used by Steve Mann, Domingo Mihovilovic, and Ronald Bracewell to describe a windowed portion of a chirp function. In Mann's words:

A wavelet is a piece of a wave, and a chirplet, similarly, is a piece of a chirp. More precisely, a chirplet is a windowed portion of a chirp function, where the window provides some time localization property. In terms of time–frequency space, chirplets exist as rotated, sheared, or other structures that move from the traditional parallelism with the time and frequency axes that are typical for waves (Fourier and short-time Fourier transforms) or wavelets.

The chirplet transform thus represents a rotated, sheared, or otherwise transformed tiling of the time–frequency plane. Although chirp signals have been known for many years in radar, pulse compression, and the like, the first published reference to the chirplet transform described specific signal representations based on families of functions related to one another by time–varying frequency modulation or frequency varying time modulation, in addition to time and frequency shifting, and scale changes. In that paper, the Gaussian chirplet transform was presented as one such example, together with a successful application to ice fragment detection in radar (improving target detection results over previous approaches). The term chirplet (but not the term chirplet transform) was also proposed for a similar transform, apparently independently, by Mihovilovic and Bracewell later that same year.

== Applications ==
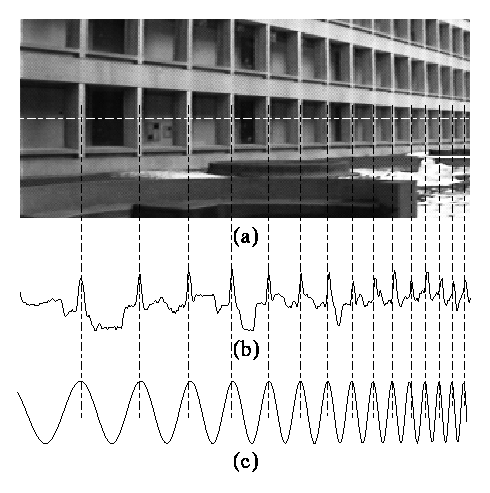
(a) In image processing, periodicity is often subject to projective geometry (i.e. chirping that arises from projection). (b) In this image, repeating structures like the alternating dark space inside the windows, and light space of the white concrete, chirp (increase in frequency) towards the right. (c) The chirplet transform is able to represent this modulated variation compactly.

The first practical application of the chirplet transform was in water-human-computer interaction (WaterHCI) for marine safety, to assist vessels in navigating through ice-infested waters, using marine radar to detect growlers (small iceberg fragments too small to be visible on conventional radar, yet large enough to damage a vessel).

Other applications of the chirplet transform in WaterHCI include the SWIM (Sequential Wave Imprinting Machine).

More recently other practical applications have been developed, including image processing (e.g. where there is periodic structure imaged through projective geometry), as well as to excise chirp-like interference in spread spectrum communications, in EEG processing, and Chirplet Time Domain Reflectometry.

== Extensions ==
The warblet transform is a particular example of the chirplet transform introduced by Mann and Haykin in 1992 and now widely used. It provides a signal representation based on cyclically varying frequency modulated signals (warbling signals).

== See also ==
- Time–frequency representation
- Other time–frequency transforms
  - Fractional Fourier transform
  - Short-time Fourier transform
  - Wavelet transform
