= Fractional wavelet transform =

Fractional wavelet transform (FRWT) is a generalization of the classical wavelet transform (WT). This transform is proposed in order to rectify the limitations of the WT and the fractional Fourier transform (FRFT). The FRWT inherits the advantages of multiresolution analysis of the WT and has the capability of signal representations in the fractional domain which is similar to the FRFT.

== Definition ==
The fractional Fourier transform (FRFT), a generalization of the Fourier transform (FT), serves a useful and powerful analyzing tool in optics, communications, signal and image processing, etc. This transform, however, has one major drawback due to using global kernel, i.e., the fractional Fourier representation only provides such FRFT spectral content with no indication about the time localization of the FRFT spectral components. Therefore, the analysis of non-stationary signals whose FRFT spectral characteristics change with time requires joint signal representations in both time and FRFT domains, rather than just a FRFT-domain representation.

The first modification to the FRFT to allow analysis of aforementioned non-stationary signals came as the short-time FRFT (STFRFT). The idea behind the STFRFT was segmenting the signal by using a time-localized window, and performing FRFT spectral analysis for each segment. Since the FRFT was computed for every windowed segment of the signal, the STFRFT was able to provide a true joint signal representation in both time and FRFT domains. However, the drawback is that the STFRFT has the limitation of a fixed window width which needs to be fixed a priori; this effectively means that it does not provide the requisite good resolution in both time and FRFT domains. In other words, the efficiency of the STFRFT techniques is limited by the fundamental uncertainty principle, which implies that narrow windows produce good time resolution but poor spectral resolution, whereas wide windows provide good spectral resolution but poor time resolution. Most of the signals of practical interest are such that they have high spectral components for short durations and low spectral components for long durations.

As a generalization of the wavelet transform, Mendlovic and David first introduced the fractional wavelet transform (FRWT) as a way to deal with optical signals, which was defined as a cascade of the FRFT and the ordinary wavelet transform (WT), i.e.,

$$\begin{align}
W^{\alpha}(a,b)&=\frac{1}{\sqrt{a}}\int\limits_{\mathbb{R}}\int\limits_{\mathbb{R}}{\mathcal K}_\alpha(u,t)f(t)\psi^{\ast}\left(\frac{u-b}{a}\right)dtdu\\
&=\frac{1}{\sqrt{a}}\int\limits_{\mathbb{R}}\left(\int\limits_{\mathbb{R}}f(t){\mathcal K}_\alpha(u,t)dt\right)\psi^{\ast}\left(\frac{u-b}{a}\right)du\\
&=\frac{1}{\sqrt{a}}\int\limits_{\mathbb{R}}F_{\alpha}(u)\psi^{\ast}\left(\frac{u-b}{a}\right)du\\
\end{align}$$

where the transform kernel $\mathcal{K}_{\alpha}(u,t)$ is given by

$$\mathcal{K}_{\alpha}(u,t)=
\begin{cases}
A_{\alpha}e^{j\frac{u^2+t^2}{2}\cot\alpha-jut\csc\alpha},&\alpha \neq k\pi\\
\delta(t-u),&\alpha = 2k\pi \\
\delta(t+u),&\alpha = (2k-1)\pi \\
\end{cases}$$

where $A_\alpha=\sqrt{{(1-j\cot\alpha)}/{2\pi}}$, and $F_{\alpha}(u)$ denotes the FRFT of $f(t)$. But it could not be regarded as a kind of joint time-FRFT-domain representation since time information is lost in this transform. Moreover, Prasad and Mahato expressed the ordinary WT of a signal in terms of the FRFTs of the signal and mother wavelet, and also called the expression the FRWT. That is,

$$\begin{align}
\left(W_{\psi}^{\alpha}f\right)(b,a)&=\frac{1}{\sqrt{a}}\int\limits_{\mathbb{R}}f(t)\psi^{\ast}\left(\frac{t-b}{a}\right)dt\\
&=\frac{\csc\alpha}{4\pi^2}\int\limits_{\mathbb{R}}F(u\sin\alpha)\Psi^{\ast}(au\sin\alpha)e^{j\frac{u^2}{4}(1-a^2)\sin2\alpha-jbu}du\\
\end{align}$$

where $F(u\sin\alpha)$ and $\Psi(u\sin\alpha)$ denote the FTs (with their arguments scaled by $\sin\alpha$) $f(t)$ and $\psi(t)$, respectively. Clearly, this so-called FRWT is identical to the ordinary WT.

Recently, Shi et al. proposed a new definition of the FRWT by introducing a new structure of the fractional convolution associated with the FRFT. Specifically, the FRWT of any function $f(t)\in L^{2}(\mathbb{R})$ is defined as [8]

$$W_{f}^{\alpha}(a,b)=\mathcal{W}^{\alpha}[f(t)](a,b)=\int\limits_{\mathbb{R}} f(t)\psi_{\alpha,a,b}^{\ast}(t)\, dt$$

where $\psi_{\alpha,a,b}(t)$ is a continuous affine transformation and chirp modulation of the mother wavelet $\psi(t)$, i.e.,

$$\psi_{\alpha,a,b}(t)=\frac{1}{\sqrt{a}}\psi\left(\frac{t-b}{a}\right)e^{-j\frac{t^2-b^2}{2}\cot\alpha}$$

in which $a\in \mathbb{R^+}$ and $b\in \mathbb{R}$ are scaling and translation parameters, respectively. Conversely, the inverse FRWT is given by

$$f(t)=\frac{1}{2\pi C_{\psi}}\int\limits_{\mathbb{R}}\int\limits_{\mathbb{R}^{+}}W_{f}^{\alpha}(a,b)\psi_{\alpha,a,b}(t)\frac{da}{a^2}db$$

where $C_{\psi}$ is a constant that depends on the wavelet used. The success of the reconstruction depends on this constant called, the admissibility constant, to satisfy the following admissibility condition:

$$C_{\psi}=\int\limits_{\mathbb{R}}{\frac{|\Psi(\Omega)|^2}{|\Omega|}}\,d\Omega<\infty$$

where $\Psi(\Omega)$ denotes the FT of $\psi(t)$. The admissibility condition implies that $\Psi(0)=0$, which is $\int_{\mathbb{R}}\psi(t)dt=0$. Consequently, continuous fractional wavelets must oscillate and behave as bandpass filters in the fractional Fourier domain. From this viewpoint, the FRWT of $f(t)$ can be expressed in terms of the FRFT-domain representation as

$$W_{f}^{\alpha}(a,b)=\int\limits_{\mathbb{R}}{\sqrt{2\pi a}F_{\alpha}(u)\Psi^{\ast}(au\csc\alpha)}\mathcal{K}^{\ast}_{\alpha}(u,b)du$$

where $F_{\alpha}(u)$ indicates the FRFT of $f(t)$, and $\Psi(u\csc\alpha)$ denotes the FT (with its argument scaled by $\csc\alpha$) of $\psi(t)$. Note that when $\alpha={\pi}/{2}$, the FRWT reduces to the classical WT. For more details of this type of the FRWT, see [8] and.

== Associated with multiresolution analysis (MRA) ==
A comprehensive overview of MRA and orthogonal fractional wavelets associated with the FRWT can be found in the paper.
