= Quadratic Fourier transform =

In mathematical physics and harmonic analysis, the quadratic Fourier transform is an integral transform that generalizes the fractional Fourier transform, which in turn generalizes the Fourier transform.

Roughly speaking, the Fourier transform corresponds to a change of variables from time to frequency (in the context of harmonic analysis) or from position to momentum (in the context of quantum mechanics). In phase space, this is a 90 degree rotation. The fractional Fourier transform generalizes this to any angle rotation, giving a smooth mixture of time and frequency, or of position and momentum. The quadratic Fourier transform extends this further to the group of all linear symplectic transformations in phase space (of which rotations are a subgroup).

More specifically, for every member of the metaplectic group (which is a double cover of the symplectic group) there is a corresponding quadratic Fourier transform.
