= Cauchy wavelet =

Continuous wavelets

In mathematics, Cauchy wavelets are a family of continuous wavelets, used in the continuous wavelet transform.

== Definition ==
The Cauchy wavelet of order $p$ is defined as:

$\psi_p(t) = \frac{\Gamma(p+1)}{2\pi}\left ( \frac{j}{t + j} \right ) ^{p+1}$

where $p > 0$ and $j = \sqrt{-1}$
therefore, its Fourier transform is defined as

$\hat{\psi_p}(\xi) = \xi^{p}e^{-\xi}I_{[\xi \geq 0]}$.

Sometimes it is defined as a function with its Fourier transform

$\hat{\psi_p}(\xi) = \rho(\xi)\xi^{p}e^{-\xi}I_{[\xi \geq 0]}$

where $\rho(\xi) \in L^{\infty}(\mathbb{R})$ and $\rho(\xi) = \rho(a\xi)$ for $\xi \in \mathbb{R}$ almost everywhere and $\rho(\xi) \neq 0$ for all $\xi \in \mathbb{R}$.

Also, it had used to be defined as

$\psi_p(t) = (\frac{j}{t + j})^{p+1}$

in previous research of Cauchy wavelet. If we defined Cauchy wavelet in this way, we can observe that the Fourier transform of the Cauchy wavelet

$\int_{-\infty}^{\infty} \hat{\psi_p}(\xi) \,d\xi = \int_{0}^{\infty} \frac{2\pi}{\Gamma(p+1)} \xi^{p}e^{-\xi} \,d\xi = 2\pi$

Moreover, we can see that the maximum of the Fourier transform of the Cauchy wavelet of order $p$ is happened at $\xi = p$ and the Fourier transform of the Cauchy wavelet is positive only in $\xi > 0$, it means that:
(1) when $p$ is low then the convolution of Cauchy wavelet is a low pass filter, and when $p$ is high the convolution of Cauchy wavelet is a high pass filter.
Since the wavelet transform equals to the convolution to the mother wavelet and the convolution to the mother wavelet equals to the multiplication between the Fourier transform of the mother wavelet and the function by the convolution theorem.
And,
(2) the design of the Cauchy wavelet transform is considered with analysis of the analytic signal.

Since the analytic signal is bijective to the real signal and there is only positive frequency in the analytic signal (the real signal has conjugated frequency between positive and negative) i.e.

$\overline{FT\{x\}(-\xi)} = FT\{x\}(\xi)$

where $x(t)$ is a real signal ($x(t) \in \mathbb{R}$, for all $t \in \mathbb{R}$)
And the bijection between analytic signal and real signal is that

$x_{+}(t) = x(t) + jx_H(t)$

$x(t) = Re\{x_{+}(t)\}$

where $x_{+}(t)$ is the corresponded analytic signal of the real signal $x(t)$, and $x_H(t)$ is Hilbert transform of $x(t)$.

== Unicity of the reconstruction ==
=== Phase retrieval problem ===
A phase retrieval problem consists in reconstructing an unknown complex function $f$ from a set of phaseless linear measurements. More precisely, let $V$ be a vector space, whose vectors are complex functions, on $\mathbb{C}$ and $\{L_i\}_{i \in I}$ a set of linear forms from $V$ to $\mathbb{C}$. We are given the set of all $\{|L_i(f)|\}_{i \in I}$, for some unknown $f \in V$ and we want to determine $f$.
This problem can be studied under three different viewpoints:
(1) Is $f$ uniquely determined by $\{|L_i(f)|\}_{i \in I}$ (up to a global phase)?
(2) If the answer to the previous question is positive, is the inverse application $\{|L_i(f)|\}_{i \in I} \implies f$ is “stable”? For example, is it continuous? Uniformly Lipschitz?
(3) In practice, is there an efficient algorithm which recovers $f$ from $\{|L_i(f)|\}_{i \in I}$?

The most well-known example of a phase retrieval problem is the case where the $L_i$ represent the Fourier coefficients:
for example:

$L_n(f) = \frac{1}{2\pi} \int_{-\pi}^{\pi} f(t)e^{-jnt} \,dt$, for $n \in \mathbb{Z}$,

where $f$ is complex-valued function on $[-\pi, \pi]$
Then, $f$ can be reconstruct by $L_n(f)$ as

$f(t) = \sum_{n=-\infty}^\infty L_n(f)e^{jnt}$.

and in fact we have Parseval's identity

$||f||^2 = \sum_{n=-\infty}^\infty |L_n(f)|^2$.

where $||f||^2 = \frac{1}{2\pi} \int_{-\pi}^{\pi} |f(t)|^2 \,dt$ i.e. the norm defined in $L^2([-\pi, \pi])$.
Hence, in this example, the index set $I$ is the integer $\mathbb{Z}$, the vector space $V$ is $L^2([-\pi, \pi])$ and the linear form $L_n$ is the Fourier coefficient. Furthermore, the absolute value of Fourier coefficients $\{|L_n(f)|\}_{n \in \mathbb{Z}}$ can only determine the norm of $f$ defined in $L^2([-\pi, \pi])$.

=== Unicity Theorem of the reconstruction ===
Firstly, we define the Cauchy wavelet transform as:

$W_{\psi_p}[x(t)](a, b) = \frac{1}{b} \int_{-\infty}^{\infty} x(t) \overline{\psi_p(\frac{t-a}{b})} \,dt$.

Then, the theorem is:

Theorem. For a fixed $p > 0$, if exist two different numbers $b_1, b_2 > 0$ and the Cauchy wavelet transform defined as above. Then, if there are two real-valued functions $f, g \in L^2(\mathbb{R})$ satisfied

$|W_{\psi_p}[f(t)](a, b_1)| = |W_{\psi_p}[g(t)](a, b_1)|$, $\forall a \in \mathbb{R}$ and

$|W_{\psi_p}[f(t)](a, b_2)| = |W_{\psi_p}[g(t)](a, b_2)|$, $\forall a \in \mathbb{R}$,

then there is a $\alpha \in \mathbb{R}$ such that $f_{+}(t) = e^{j\alpha}g_{+}(t)$.

$f_{+}(t) = e^{j\alpha}g_{+}(t)$ implies that

$Re\{f_{+}(t)\} = Re\{e^{j\alpha}g_{+}(t)\} \implies f(t) = \cos{\alpha} g(t) - \sin{\alpha} g_H(t)$ and

$Im\{f_{+}(t)\} = Im\{e^{j\alpha}g_{+}(t)\} \implies f_H(t) = \sin{\alpha} g(t) + \cos{\alpha} g_H(t)$.

Hence, we get the relation

$f(t) = (\cos{\alpha}-\sin{\alpha}\tan{\alpha}) g(t) - \tan{\alpha} f_H(t)$

and $f(t), g_H(t) \in span\{f_H(t), g(t)\} = span\{f(t), f_H(t)\} = span\{g(t), g_H(t)\}$.

Back to the phase retrieval problem, in the Cauchy wavelet transform case, the index set $I$ is $\mathbb{R} \times \{b_1, b_2\}$ with $b_1 \neq b_2$ and $b_1, b_2 > 0$, the vector space $V$ is $L^2(\mathbb{R})$ and the linear form $L_{(a, b)}$ is defined as $L_{(a, b)}(f) = W_{\psi_p}[f(t)](a, b)$. Hence, $\{|L_{(a, b)}(f)|\}_{a, b \in \mathbb{R} \times \{b_1, b_2\}}$ determines the two dimensional subspace $span\{f,f_H\}$ in $L^2(\mathbb{R})$.
