= Haldun Ozaktas =

Turkish engineer

Haldun Ozaktas from the Bilkent University, Bilkent, Turkey was named Fellow of the Institute of Electrical and Electronics Engineers (IEEE) in 2014 for contributions to transforms for signal processing in optics.
