= Time–frequency representation =

A time–frequency representation (TFR) is a view of a signal (taken to be a function of time) represented over both time and frequency. Time–frequency analysis means analysis into the time–frequency domain provided by a TFR. This is achieved by using a formulation often called "Time–Frequency Distribution", abbreviated as TFD.

TFRs are often complex-valued fields over time and frequency, where the modulus of the field represents either amplitude or "energy density" (the concentration of the root mean square over time and frequency), and the argument of the field represents phase.

== Background and motivation ==
A signal, as a function of time, may be considered as a representation with perfect time resolution. In contrast, the magnitude of the Fourier transform (FT) of the signal may be considered as a representation with perfect spectral resolution but with no time information because the magnitude of the FT conveys frequency content but it fails to convey when, in time, different events occur in the signal.

TFRs provide a bridge between these two representations in that they provide some temporal information and some spectral information simultaneously. Thus, TFRs are useful for the representation and analysis of signals containing multiple time-varying frequencies.

== Formulation of TFRs and TFDs ==
One form of TFR (or TFD) can be formulated by the multiplicative comparison of a signal with itself, expanded in different directions about each point in time. Such representations and formulations are known as quadratic or "bilinear" TFRs or TFDs (QTFRs or QTFDs) because the representation is quadratic in the signal (see Bilinear time–frequency distribution). This formulation was first described by Eugene Wigner in 1932 in the context of quantum mechanics and, later, reformulated as a general TFR by Ville in 1948 to form what is now known as the Wigner–Ville distribution, as it was shown in that Wigner's formula needed to use the analytic signal defined in Ville's paper to be useful as a representation and for a practical analysis. Today, QTFRs include the spectrogram (squared magnitude of short-time Fourier transform), the scaleogram (squared magnitude of Wavelet transform) and the smoothed pseudo-Wigner distribution.

Although quadratic TFRs offer perfect temporal and spectral resolutions simultaneously, the quadratic nature of the transforms creates cross-terms, also called "interferences". The cross-terms caused by the bilinear structure of TFDs and TFRs may be useful in some applications such as classification as the cross-terms provide extra detail for the recognition algorithm. However, in some other applications, these cross-terms may plague certain quadratic TFRs and they would need to be reduced. One way to do this is obtained by comparing the signal with a different function. Such resulting representations are known as linear TFRs because the representation is linear in the signal. An example of such a representation is the windowed Fourier transform (also known as the short-time Fourier transform) which localises the signal by modulating it with a window function, before performing the Fourier transform to obtain the frequency content of the signal in the region of the window.

== Wavelet transforms ==
Wavelet transforms, in particular the continuous wavelet transform, expand the signal in terms of wavelet functions which are localised in both time and frequency. Thus the wavelet transform of a signal may be represented in terms of both time and frequency. Continuous wavelet transform analysis is very useful for identifying non-stationary signals in time series, such as those related to climate or landslides.

The notions of time, frequency, and amplitude used to generate a TFR from a wavelet transform were originally developed intuitively. In 1992, a quantitative derivation of these relationships was published, based upon a stationary phase approximation.

== Linear canonical transformation ==
Linear canonical transformations are the linear transforms of the time–frequency representation that preserve the symplectic form. These include and generalize the Fourier transform, fractional Fourier transform, and others, thus providing a unified view of these transforms in terms of their action on the time–frequency domain.

== See also ==
- Newland transform
- Reassignment method
- Time–frequency analysis for music signals
