= Belkaid =

Belkaid or Belkaïd is a surname, and may refer to:

- Aboubakr Belkaid (1934–1995), Algerian politician
- Bouchaib Belkaid (born 1967), Moroccan sprinter
- Farouk Belkaïd (born 1977), Algerian footballer
- Yasmine Belkaid (born 1968), Algerian immunologist
