= Yasmine Amhis =

French-Algerian particle physicist

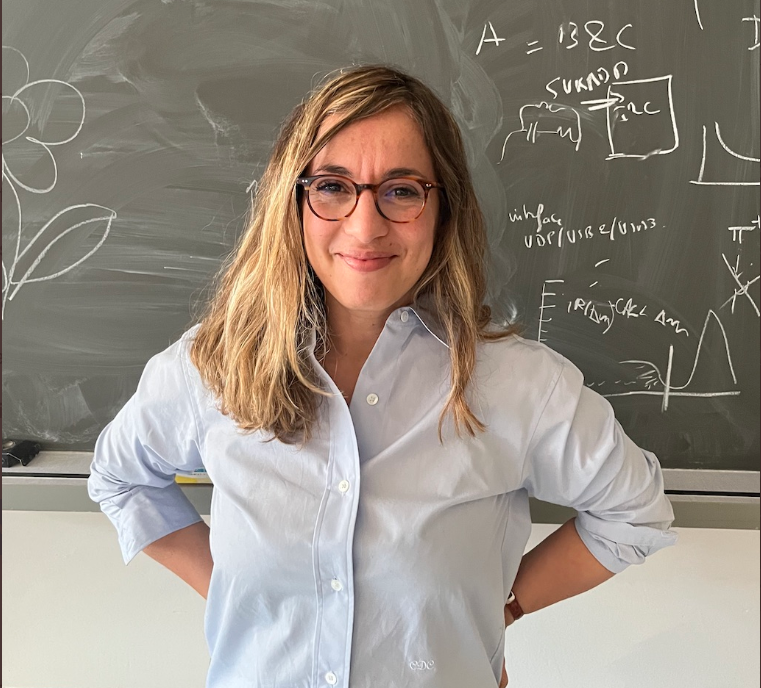
- Yasmine Amhis (2022)
- Born: 1982 (age 43–44); Algiers, Algeria
- Education: University of Paris-Sud
- Known for: Research on "bottom-quark" baryon
- Awards: Jacques Herbrand Prize (2016)
- Scientific career
- Fields: Particle physics
- Workplaces: CNRS
- Doctoral advisor: Marie-Hélène Schune and Jacques Lefrançois

Yasmine Amhis (born 1982, Algiers) is a French-Algerian particle physicist. In 2016, she was awarded the Jacques Herbrand Prize.

== Early life and education ==
In 1999, after high school in Algeria, Yasmine Amhis pursued undergraduate studies in France. She obtained her master's degree at the University of Paris-Sud in Orsay, then earned a thesis grant in 2006 and started her work at IJCLab Orsay under the supervision of Marie -Hélène Schune and Jacques Lefrançois. Work on her thesis introduced her to the LHCb experiment at CERN. After she obtained her PhD, she moved to Switzerland for a three-year postdoctoral position at the École Polytechnique Fédérale de Lausanne. She is the granddaughter of the Algerian poet and writer Djoher Amhis-Ouksel.

== Career ==
In 2012, she obtained a permanent research scientist position at CNRS. Her outstanding academic career was published by Campus France, France Alumni, in 2017.

Amhis has devoted her research to topics related to the "bottom-quark" baryon, topics she reviewed in 2017 and 2022. In 2016, she was awarded the Jacques-Herbrand prize by the French Academy of Sciences Given her expertise and her commitment to the LHCb experiment, a collaboration of more than 1,000 scientists, she was elected in April 2022 to the strategic position of "physics coordinator".

== Engagements ==
Given her background and origins, Amhis, involved naturally with other physicists from the African diaspora to the development of science for developing countries. She engaged in the initiative of the "African Strategy for Fundamental and Applied Physics" (ASFAP) founded in 2020 by among others, Fairouz Malek and Ketevi Assamagan. Up to 2022, she coordinated the group responsible for the strategy in particle and astroparticle physics.

== Publications ==
Amhis is the author or co-author of more than 600 articles, most of them related to the LHCb experiment. Among all of these articles, 14 have been cited more than 500 times

== Awards ==
In 2016, Amhis received the Jacques-Herbrand prize from the French Academy of Sciences.
