= Maryam Abacha American University Niger =

Private university in the Republic of Niger

- Motto: Knowledge Is Life
- Type: Private
- Established: 2013; 13 years ago
- President: Adamu Abubakar Gwarzo
- Location: Maradi, Maradi, Niger
- Campus: Urban
- Website: maaun.edu.ne

Maryam Abacha American University of Niger (MAAUN) is the first English speaking university in the Republic of Niger and also the first bilingual university in the Sub-Saharan Africa. it is a large private International university situated in Maradi, Niger. second largest city in Niger Republic, is an institution with a wide range of programs, faculties and departments, offering undergraduate and post graduate degrees in Applied and Basic sciences, in Liberal Arts, in Social and Management sciences. It is a university with a population of over ten thousand under graduates and more than five thousand post graduate students.

== History ==
The university was founded in 2013 by Professor Adamu Abubakar Gwarzo, a renowned journalist in Maradi, Niger. with the mission to provide opportunities for teaming youths to acquire knowledge and skills in different fields and professions, for them to prepare themselves for life challenges and decide what to do with their knowledge; either be self employed, join the private sector or seek employment in the public service. The university is named after the wife of former Nigerian President Sani Abacha, Maryam Abacha, based on her efforts to mobilize and support African countries. It is recognized by the Nigerian Government Federal Ministry of Education and accredited by the Accreditation Service for International Colleges (ASIC) and the National University Commission (NUC). It is a member of the American Council on Education (ACE).

MAAUN is a member of International Association of Universities (an affiliation of UNESCO) Paris.

MAAUN has a life membership with International Academic and Management Association (IAMA) India.

MAAUN is a member of Association of African Universities (AAU) Ghana

MAAUN is a member of Association of African Private Universities (AAPU). Nigeria

== Faculties ==
=== Faculty Social and Management Science ===
- Bachelor of Science (B.Sc) - Political Science
- Bachelor of Science (B.Sc) - International Relations
- Bachelor of Art (B.A) - Public Administration
- Bachelor of Science (B.Sc) - Sociology
- Bachelor of Art (B.A) - Mass Communication

=== Faculty of Business Studies ===
- Bachelor of Science (B.Sc) - Accounting
- Bachelor of Science (B.Sc) - Business administration
- Bachelor of Science (B.Sc) - International Trade and Economics
- Bachelor of Science (B.Sc) - International Economic and Finance

=== Faculty of Health Sciences ===
- Bachelor of Science (B.Sc) - Environmental Health and safety
- Bachelor of Science (B.Sc) - Community Health and Development
- Bachelor of Science (B.Sc) - Nursing.
- Bachelor of Science (B.Sc) - Public Health
- Bachelor of medical laboratory science (BMLS) - Medical Laboratory Science.
- Bachelor of Medical and Bachelor of Surgical-(MBBS)

=== Faculty of Languages ===
- Bachelor of Art (B.A) - French
- Bachelor of Art (B.A) - English

=== Faculty of Law ===
- Bachelor of Art (BA) - Law (LLB)

=== Faculty of Applied Science and Engineering ===
- BSc. Computer Engineering
- BSc. Computer Science
- BSc. Information Technology
- BSc. Software Engineering
- BSc. Cyber Security
- BSc. Animal health Science

=== School of Post Graduate Studies ===
- M.Sc Nursing
- Master in Public Health
- Master in Business Administration
- Masters in International Relations and Diplomacy
- MSc Environmental Health
- M.A. French
- Master in International Law

== See also ==
- List of universities in Niger
- Education in Niger
