= University of Tillabéri =

University in Tillabéri, Niger

- Université de Tillabéri
- Type: Public
- Established: 2014
- Rector: Boureima Alpha Gado
- Location: Tillabéri, Niger; 14.2103°N 1.4528°E
- Language: French
- Website: uti.refer.ne

The University of Tillabéri, located in Tillabéri, Niger, was established by Law No. 2014-14 on 19 August 2014, following the approval by the Nigerien Parliament of the bill to create four new universities. The other three universities created simultaneously are those of Diffa, Dosso and Agadez, bringing the total number of universities in the country to eight, alongside those in Niamey, Maradi, Tahoua and Zinder.
