= Alliance of International Doctors =

Turkish non-governmental organization

Alliance of International Doctors, Uluslararası Doktorlar Derneği
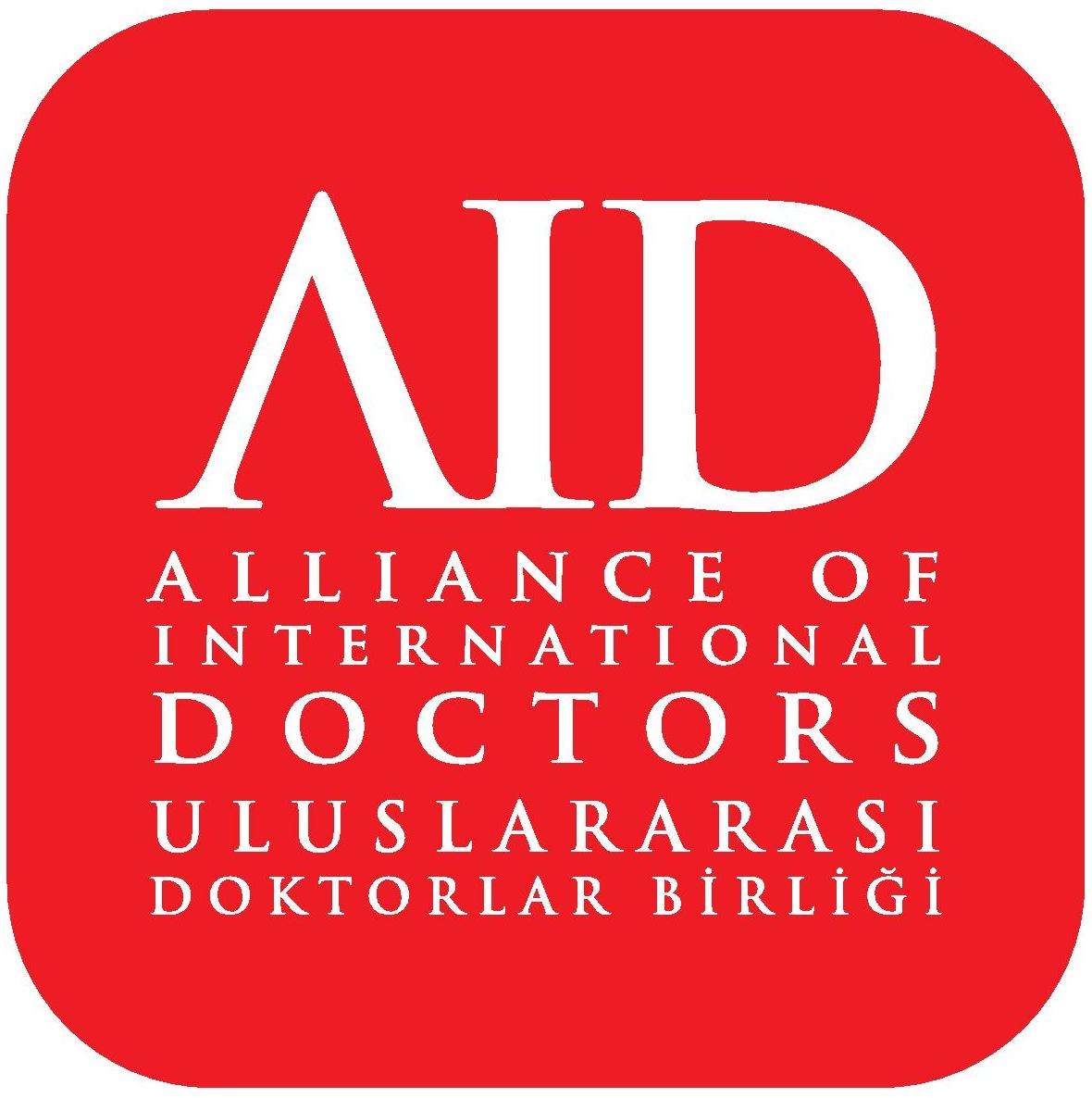
- Founded: 2011
- Type: NGO
- Location: Istanbul, Turkey
- Region served: Worldwide
- Key people: Dr. Mevlit Yurtseven
- Website: www.aidoctors.org

Alliance of International Doctors (AID, Uluslararası Doktorlar Derneği in Turkish) is an organization established by a group of volunteer doctors, pharmacists, dentists, and nurses in Istanbul in 2011. AID provides medical assistance to the people in the regions affected by disasters and poverty. The president of the organization is Dr. Mevlit Yurtseven.

== Activities ==
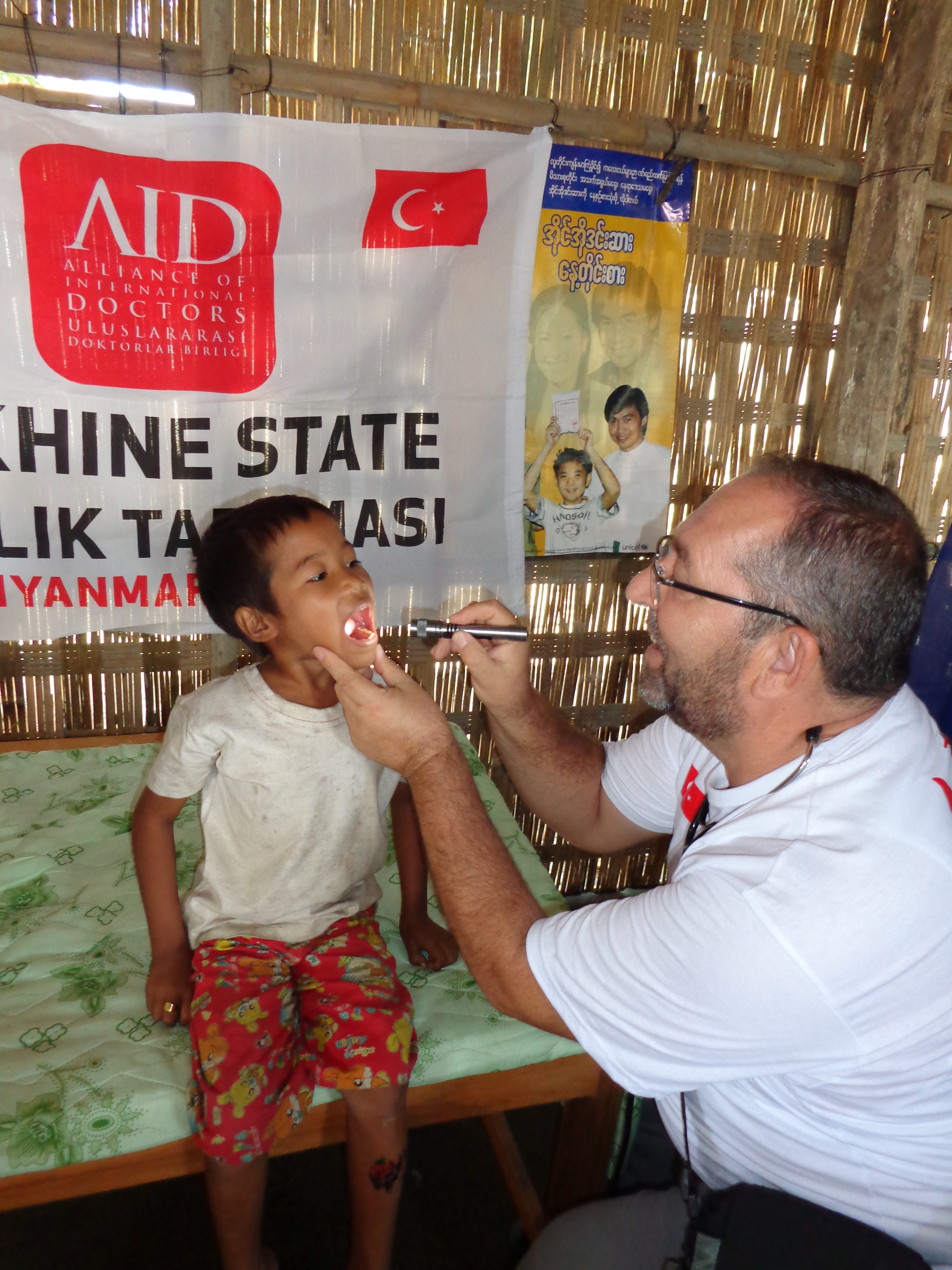
Volunteer AID Doctor examining a child

=== Emergency medical relief ===
AID has been conducting health screenings, hygiene kit distribution and vaccinations for the Syrians affected by the Syrian Civil War. AID provided primary health care to the Syrian refugees from Kobane following the mass influx in September 2014.

=== Permanent and preventive health services ===
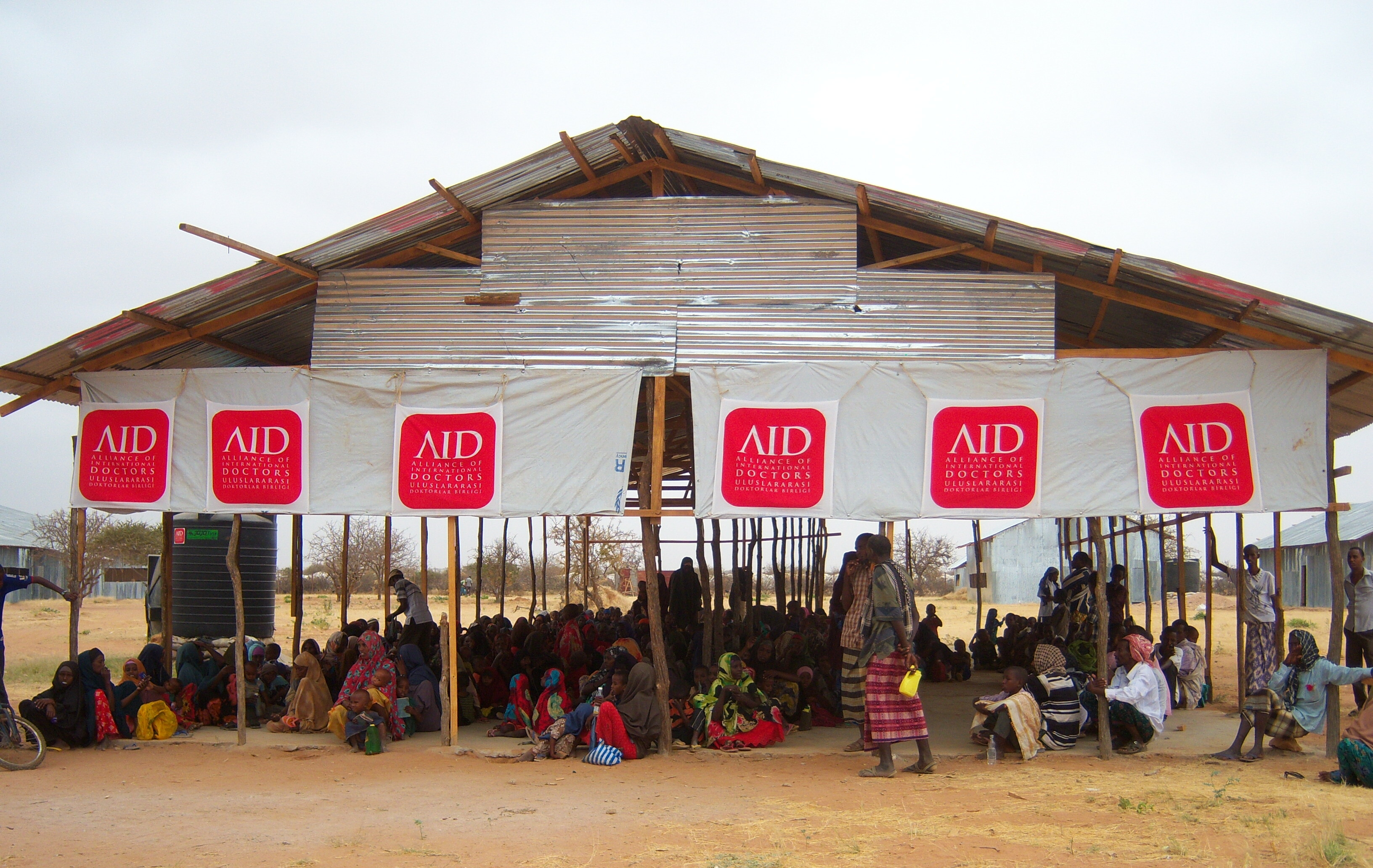
Queue of patients at the AID clinic in the refugee camp

AID provided primary health care to Somali refugees in Kenya's Dadaab Refugee Camp between August 2011 and July 2012. AID volunteers implemented mosquito net distribution projects in Kenya and Uganda for malaria prevention, and established a mother-and-child health center in Uganda. AID carried out circumcision projects in some of the Balkan countries, Tunisia, and Bangladesh for orphans and underprivileged children.

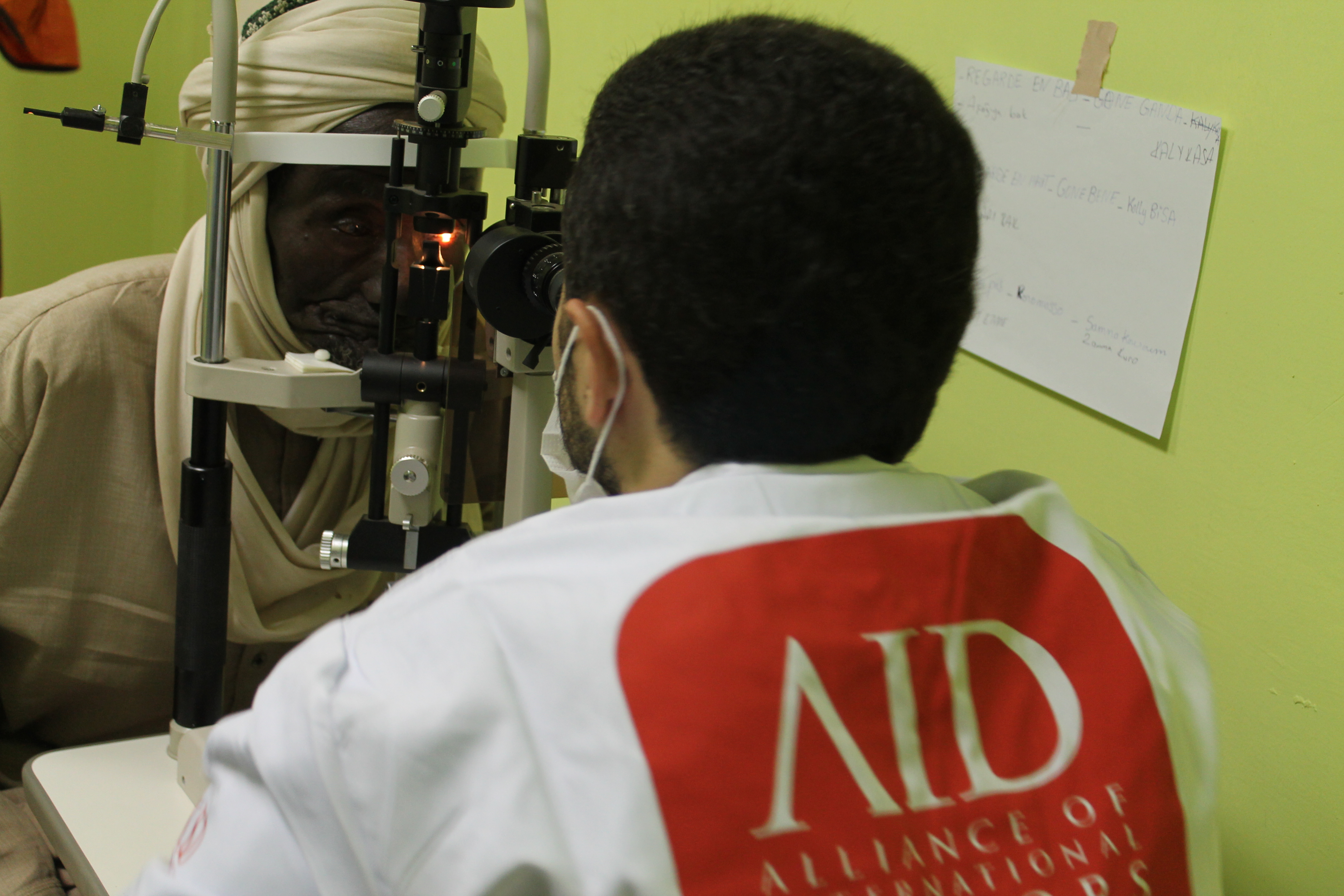
Eye examination taken before cataract operation

AID collaborates with IHH, the Islamic Development Bank, Turkish International Cooperation and Development Agency, and Niger Ministry of Health for a cataract project in Niamey, Niger. An ophthalmology department has been established at Lamorde Hospital of Abdou Moumouni University for the project, which targets to perform 30,000 free-of-charge cataract surgeries in five years and to transfer skills to the local personnel. AID is responsible for the human resources and for providing and maintaining the medical equipment and consumables. AID will collaborate with other organizations working on prevention of blindness during the project. The department will be handed over to the Niger authorities in 2019.

=== Health education ===
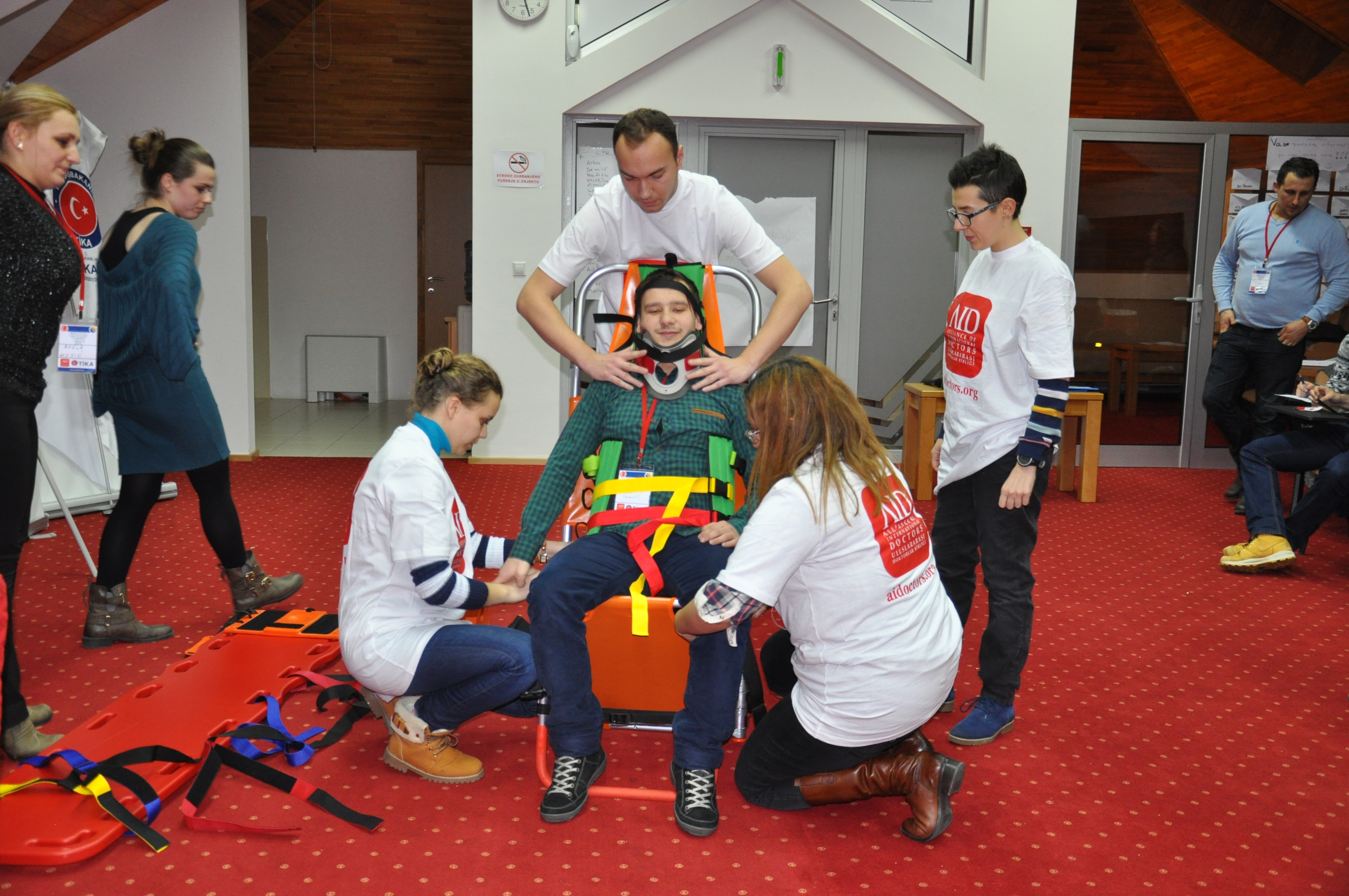
Practical training for disasters and emergencies

AID is providing health education services in coordination with local organizations in different regions.

=== Psychological rehabilitation ===
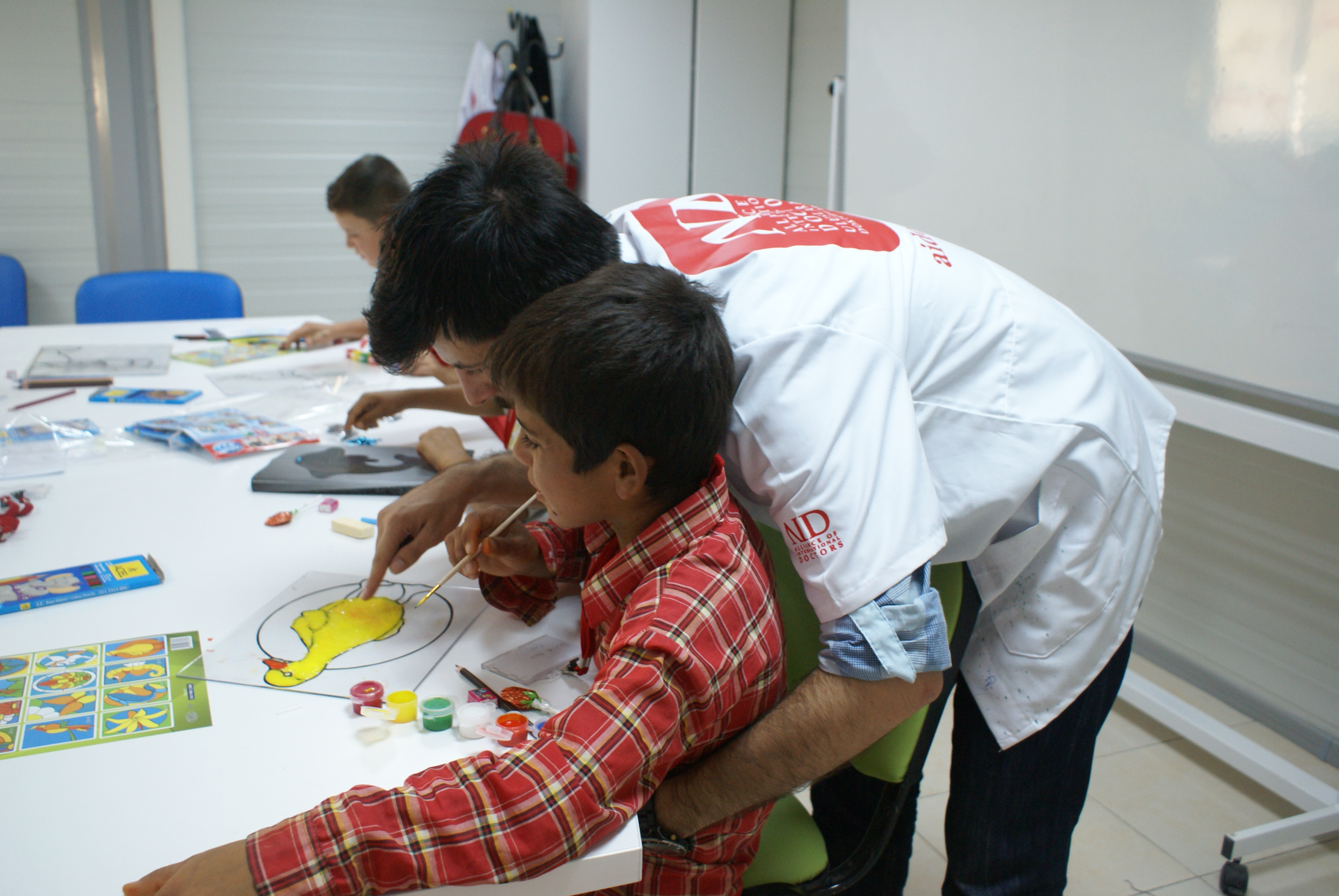
AID volunteer in Syria doing psychological support activities with a child

AID conducts psychological support programs to help the victims of natural disasters and wars as well as orphans and their families cope with the trauma and the loss they had experienced, and to reduce the negative impacts of these experiences on them. AID is providing psychosocial support to Syrian refugee women and children in Istanbul including psychotherapy since 2014.
