= University of Dosso =

Public university in Niger

- Université de Dosso
- Motto: The Future is Already Tomorrow
- Type: Public university
- Established: 2014; 12 years ago
- Rector: Zibo Garba
- Location: Dosso, Dosso; 13.0476°N 3.2006°E
- Language: French
- Website: Official website

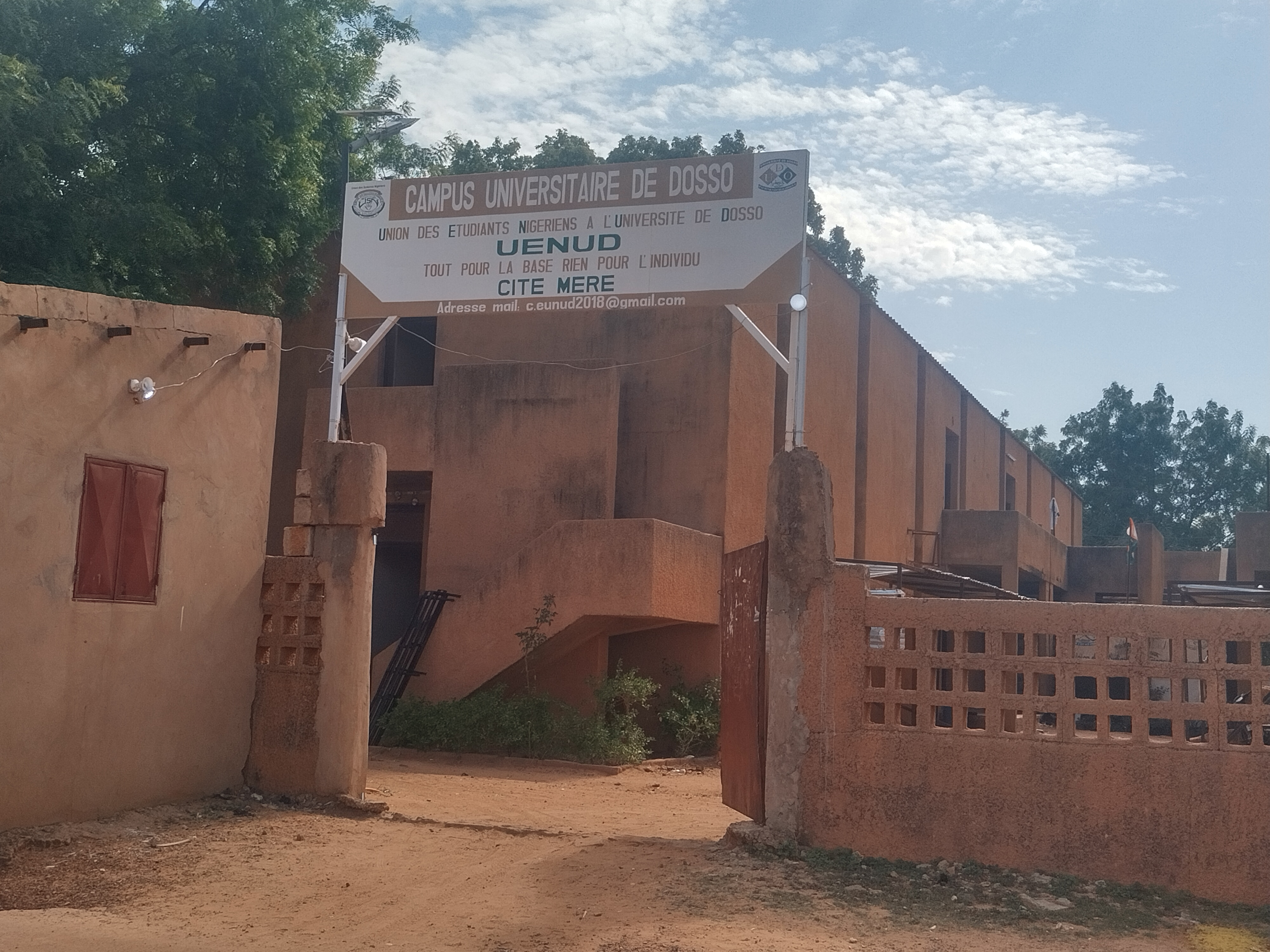
University of Dosso, Niger

The Université de Dosso (UDO), also known as Université de Dosso, is a public university located in Dosso, Niger.

== History ==
To alleviate the strain on existing Nigerien universities, on April 10, 2014, the Council of Ministers approved the creation of four new universities: Agadez, Diffa, Dosso, and Tillabéri. This decision was unanimously supported by the deputies of the National Assembly. The university was established by Law No. 2014-40 on August 19, 2014.

== Specialization ==
The university specializes in information and communication technology (ICT) and is set to host a "Technological Hub for the Development of the Digital Economy" (TECHNODEN) to foster digital economy development in Niger.

== Organization and programs ==
Ultimately, the university will consist of three components: the university itself, an Institute of Technology (IUT), and a technopole. It currently offers two undergraduate degrees: one in Networks and Telecommunications, and another in Multimedia and Internet Professions.

== See also ==
- List of universities in Niger
- Education in Niger
