= Aboubacar Ibrahim International University =

Private University in Maradi, Niger Republic

- ABII University
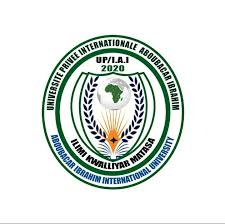
- Type: Private
- Established: 2020; 6 years ago
- Vice-Chancellor: Dr. Mahamane Laouali Aboubacar
- Academic staff: 78
- Administrative staff: 15
- Students: 631
- Undergraduates: 580
- Postgraduates: 51
- Location: Maradi, Maradi, Niger; 13°10′N 32°40′E
- Colours
- Website: www.abiiuniversity-niger.com

Aboubacar Ibrahim International University is a private university in the city of Maradi in the Republic of Niger.

== Faculties ==
The university has six (6) faculties:

Faculty of Educational Sciences

- Department of teaching didactics
- Department of educational administration and planning

Faculty of Sharia and Law

- Department of Islamic Finance
- Department of Civil Law
- Department of Islamic Law
- Department of Islamic Studies

Faculty of Arts and Humanities

- Department of Sociology
- Department of French
- Department of Geography
- Department of Communication

Faculty of Administrative and Economic Sciences

- Department of Islamic Economics
- Department of Public Administration
- Department of Economics
- Department of international relations

Faculty of Technical and Environmental Sciences

- Department of Computer Science
- Department of Physics (renewable energy)
- Department of Biology (environmental management)

Faculty of Health Sciences

- Department of Nursing
- Department of Midwifery Sciences
- Department of Community Health and safety
- Department of Environmental health and development

== See also ==
- List of universities in Niger
- Education in Niger
