= Adolé Glitho-Akueson =

Togolese entomologist

- Born: Adolé Isabelle Glitho-Akueson; 4 May 1949 (age 77); Cove, Benin
- Citizenship: Togo
- Occupation: Professor of Animal Biology

Academic work
- Discipline: Entomology
- Sub-discipline: Medical and horticultural entomology

Adolé Isabelle Glitho-Akueson (born 4 May 1949) is a Togolese entomologist who is Professor of Animal Biology at the University of Lomé. She is the chair of UNESCO's "Women, Science and Sustainable Water Management in West Africa and Central Africa" committee and a Fellow of the African Academy of Sciences.

== Biography ==
Glitho-Akueson was born on 4 May 1949 in Benin. She went to secondary school in Benin and also studied for her undergraduate degree there. In 1973 she moved to France to study at University of Dijon, from where she was awarded her Masters in Animal Biology in 1975. She continued to study as was awarded her doctorate in Insect Physiology in 1977.

In 1978, she returned to West Africa and began her first academic post as assistant lecturer in Animal Biology in the Faculty of Sciences in University of Lomé in September 1978. In 1981, she was appointed to a full lectureship. In 1989 she awarded a scholarship, funded by the African Union, to study electron microscopy at the University of Tours. In 1992, she was appointed Assistant Professor in Animal Biology (specialty in Entomology) at the University of Lomé. In 1998 she was appointed to a full professorship.

Glitho-Akueson was employed as a visiting fellow at the Universities of Tours (1993 - 2011), Niamey and Ouagadougou (1990 - 2015). Her expertise lies in the integrated management of pest populations.

She is a member of the advisory committee of the Sustainable Food Security for West and Central Africa (SADAOC) Foundation. She holds the UNESCO Chair "Women, Science and Sustainable Water Management in West Africa” and is an expert in access to higher education for women in Africa. She has published over 130 papers and has acted as international advisor on a number of large-scale global research programmes. She is the Vice-Président of Togolese National Academy of Science, Art and Letters (ANSALT) and a Fellow of the African Academy of Sciences.

== Awards ==
- Knight of CAMES Academic Palms
- Knight of La Légion d’Honneur (France)
- Laureate for the Regional African Union Kwame Nkrumah Scientific Award - 2013
