= Higher Institute of Mining, Industry and Geology =

Institute of technology in Niamey, Niger

Coordinates: 13.501°N 2.087°E

- École des Mines, de l'Industrie et de la Géologie (EMIG)
- Type: Public – Government of Niger; Ministry of Education)
- Established: 1990; 36 years ago (First Academic Year)
- Affiliations: Agence universitaire de la francophonie (AUF)
- Students: 356 (2010)
- Location: Niamey, Niamey Capitol District, Niger
- Campus: Main: 1349 rue du CHU Lamordé BP 732/Niamey, Niger
- Website: http://www.emig-niger.org/

Higher Institute of Mining, Industry and Geology (fr. École des Mines, de l'Industrie et de la Géologie de Niamey, EMIG) is the only Institute of technology in Niger dedicated to the formation of engineers and technicians. EMIG's educational disciplines expend into fields such as mining, geology, mechanical and civil engineering.

EMIG is under the tutelage of the Ministry of Education. Located on the right bank of the Niger River in Niamey, EMIG was established in 1982 as an international institution from the Economic Community of West African States (ECOWAS) (fr. Communauté Économique des États de l'Afrique de l'Ouest). The first students were enrolled in January 1990. In July 1995 EMIG was retro-ceded to the Nigerien government. However EMIG still attracts students from other African countries. In 2010, 13% of EMIG students were foreigners. The current 20 ha campus includes laboratories, student dormitories and a restaurant.

EMIG is a fast-growing higher education institution: from less than 70 students in 1996 to more than 350 in 2010.

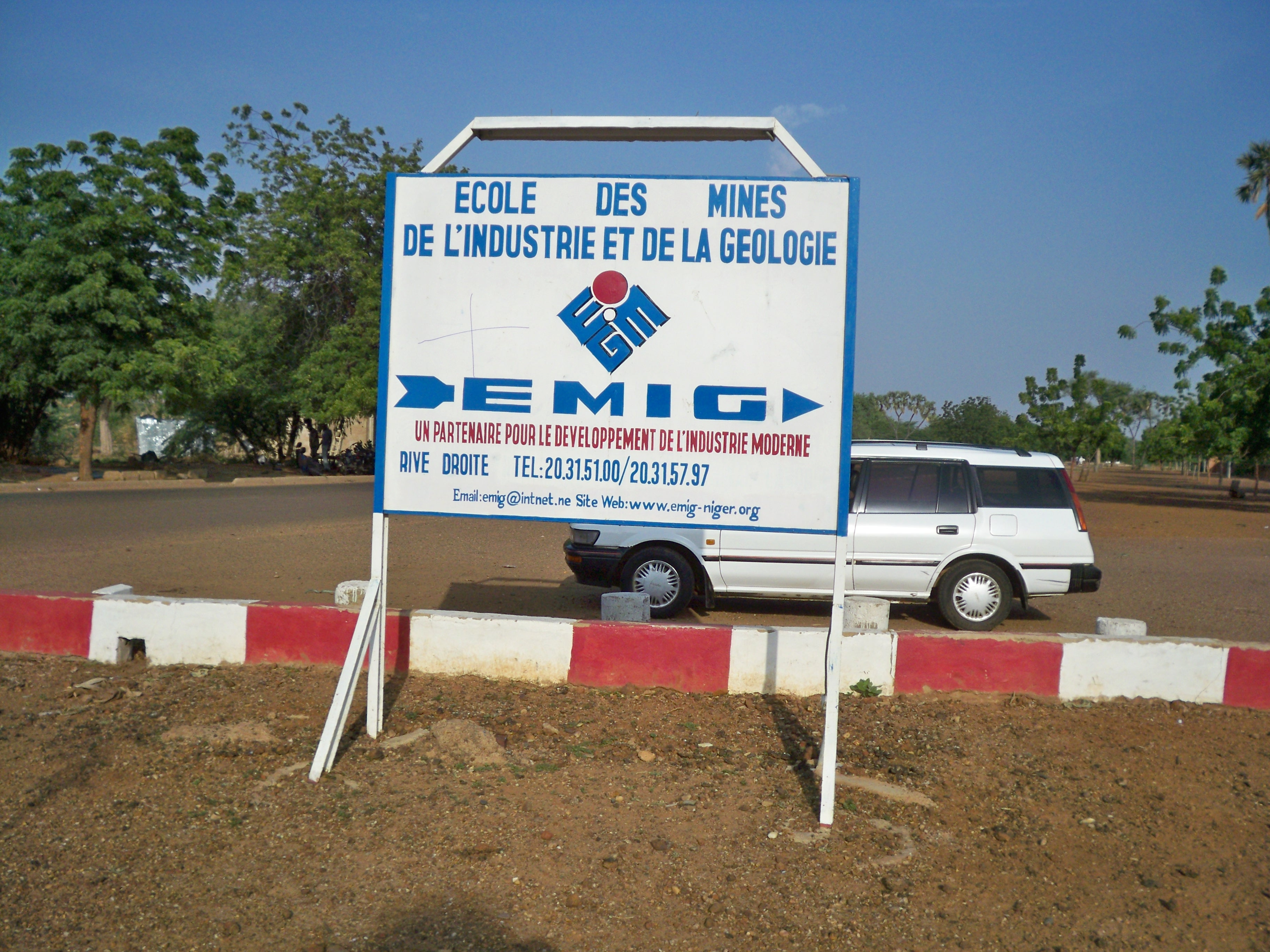
EMIG Signboard at Campus Entrance

== See also ==
- List of universities in Niger
- Education in Niger
