= Abdou Moumouni Dioffo =

Nigerien physicist

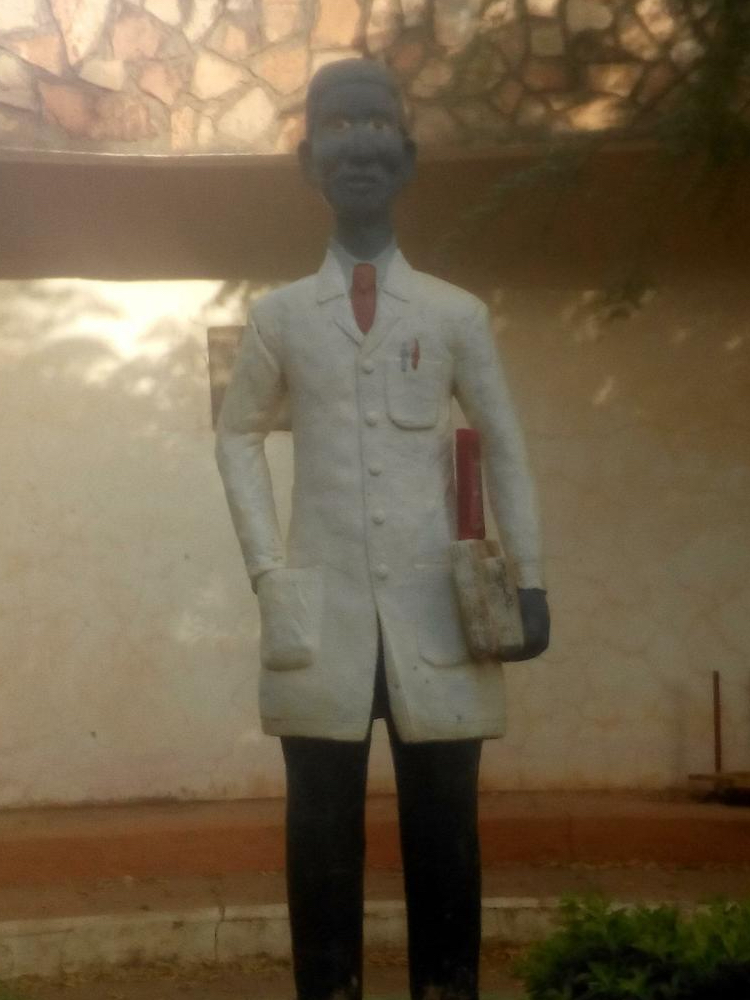
- Born: 26 June 1929; Tessaoua, Niger
- Died: 7 April 1991 (aged 61); Niamey, Niger
- Resting place: Kirtachi, Niger
- Education: École William Ponty; Sorbonne University
- Spouse: Aïssata Moumouni
- Scientific career
- Fields: Physical Sciences
- Workplaces: Abdou Moumouni University

Abdou Moumouni Dioffo (June 26, 1929 – April 7, 1991) was a Nigerien physicist, professor, and activist known for his research and activities related to alternative energies and specifically focused on solar energy.

== Early life and education ==
Born in Tessaoua, Niger, he was a member of the Zarma elite family. He finished primary education in Niger. His schooling continued in Senegal at École William Ponty and at the Lycée Van Hollenhoven in Dakar. After that, he moved to Paris, where he studied at the Lycée Saint-Louis from 1949 to 1951 doing preparatory studies for the grandes écoles.

Dioffo received his baccalauréat in physical sciences in 1953, a graduate diploma in 1954, and a state doctorate in physical sciences from Sorbonne University in 1967. He also received a scholarship to attend the USSR Academy of Sciences from 1962 to 1964.

== Career ==
=== Professional career ===
Dioffo has worked at different educational institutions, including the Van Vollenhoven High School in Dakar, Lycée Donka in Conakry, Classical and Modern College of Niamey and École normale supérieure de Bamako. He created and ran the Solar Energy Laboratory of the Republic of Mali from 1964 to 1969 and made significant contributions to the usages of solar energy.

When he returned to Niger in 1969 Abdou Moumouni entered into leadership roles de Mali, such as leading the Niger Solar Energy Office (ONERSOL) from 1969 to 1985. Moumouni was president of the University of Niamey from 1979 to 1982 and served as a Professor of Physical Sciences at the Faculty of Science of the University of Niamey from 1975 to 1991.

=== Contributions to solar energy ===
He became recognized as a leading expert in the field of solar energy during the years that he oversaw major research projects and fueIed the use of renewable energy to national governments and bureaucracies. He worked as a consultant for the Governments of Algeria, UNESCO, the African Development Bank, the IMF, the World Bank, and made a substantial contribution to the UNESCO International Congress on solar energy.

=== Works and publications ===
He is the author of a number of distinguished works, for example, the book "L'éducation en Afrique" (1964), in which he called for an educational reform in post-colonial Africa. He also published pivotal solar research and patents, and helped to establish the Federation of Black African Students in France and the African Independence Party.

== Legacy ==
He died on 7 April 1991, and is buried in Kirtachi, Niger. A foundation was subsequently established in his name. And, to acknowledge his contributions in education and scientific innovation, in 1992, the University of Niamey has been renamed the Abdou Moumouni University. Abdou Moumouni’s legacy continues to be preserved in the foundation as they embody his contributions to science, education and the use of renewable, solar energy.

== Honours ==
- Commander of the National Order of Niger
- Officer of the Academic Palms of Niger
- "Guinness Awards for scientific achievement"
- World Intellectual Property Organization Gold Medal Diploma

== Scientific contributions ==
He participated in various conferences and published different articles. His notable scientific contributions include:

- New Experimental Results on Concentrated Radiation (1966), based on new experimental results on energy distribution in the focal plane of parabolic mirrors, which appeared in the Proceedings of the Académie des Sciences, Paris.
- Theoretical Justification of Experimental Results (1966), based on theoretical aspects of experimental results on concentrated energy distribution, which appeared in a Weekly Session of the Paris Academy of Sciences.
- Evaluation of Thermoelectric Radiometers (1968), this paper examined the operation of thermoelectric radiometers having absorbing receiving discs under different speeds, which highlighted their specificities.
- Theoretic Examination of Optical Characteristics (1968), this work examined the optical characteristics of a system of dielectric blades. It also presented applications with regard to the capture of solar radiation, and the polarization of light through refraction.
- The Utilization of Solar Energy in Third World Nations (1972), Abdou Moumouni contributed to a National Academy of Science report in Washington on the utilization of solar energy in third world nations as a source/fuel.
- Contribution to Thermoelectric Systems (1973), Presented at the Congress "The Sun at the Service of Man" at UNESCO, this contribution examined the study and experiments conducted on a solar water heater adapted for the conditions of the Sahel region.
- ONERSOL Solar Engine (1977), Concerning the applications of solar energy, Abdou Moumouni presented the ONERSOL solar engine at a conference in Toulouse on developments in solar collector technology.
- Possibilities and Limitation of Renewable Energy in Africa (1990), Presented to the African Development Bank, World Bank and the UNDP, this paper contained a comprehensive overview of the possibilities and limitations of renewable energy in the context of Africa.
