= University of Lomé =

Public university in Togo

- Université de Lomé
- Former name: University of Benin
- Motto: Futurae Generis Humani Fides (Latin)
- Motto in English: "Faith in the future of the human race"
- Established: 1970; 56 years ago
- Head: Koffi Ahadzi Nonon
- Students: 40,000
- Location: Lomé, Togo; 6.173669°N 1.215866°E
- Website: www.univ-lome.tg

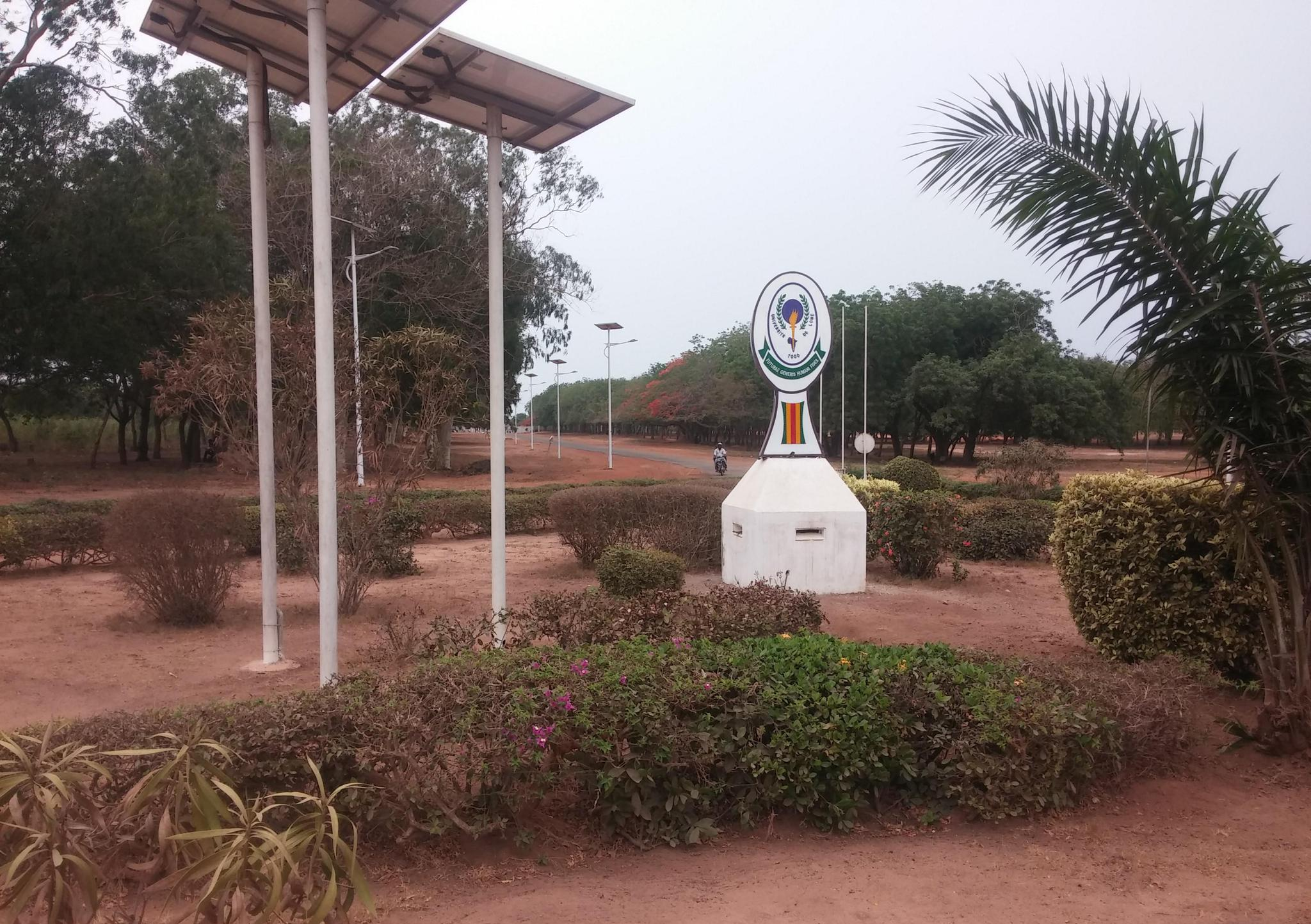
University of Lomé entrance

The University of Lomé (French: Université de Lomé; abbreviated UL) is a public university in Togo, located in the capital Lomé. It is the country's largest university. It was founded in 1970 as the University of Benin (French: Université du Bénin) and adopted its current name in 2001.

== 2011 student riots ==
In May 2011, the government of Togo ordered the indefinite closure of University of Lomé after students started riots demanding better conditions and food. The riots began on Wednesday, 25 May 2011, and escalated through the rest of the week culminating in a clash on Friday between students and police which required the use of tear gas to disperse the roughly 500 rioting students. Authorities stated that the rioters were invading lecture halls, assaulting lecturers and other students, and destroying university property. The university was closed on Friday, 27 May 2011.

The head of the institution, Koffi Ahadzi Nonon, stated that the students were upset that the university had introduced a new academic system called LMD (translated as bachelor, master, doctorate) for which the students were unprepared. On 26 May 2011, the Embassy of the United States in Lomé, Togo, issued a warden message to U.S. citizens in Togo to avoid the university campus area until the riots had ceased and stating that tear gas may have been used on 25 May, against the demonstrators.

On 6 June 2011, an agreement between the university and the students was reached as students affirmed their commitment to the new LMD academic system and that the university would improve the students' living conditions. On 15 June, the head of student organisation, the Movement for the Development of Togolese Students or MEET, was arrested for attempting to incite possible violent resistance. The head of Hacam — another student organisation — condemned the actions of the head of MEET.

On 8 July 2011, students and government representatives signed a formal agreement allowing current students to continue on the classic academic system or switch to the LMD system at their option and which stated that the government would invest 2.4 billion CFA francs (roughly US$4,800,000) into the construction of new lectures halls and versatile teaching blocks at the University of Lomé and the University of Kara.

== Notable alumni ==
- Yawo Adomayakpor, Togo's ambassador to the Democratic Republic of the Congo, graduated from the University of Lomé.
- Kétévi Adiklè Assamagan, American engineer and physicist at Brookhaven National Laboratory
- Adolé Isabelle Glitho-Akueson, Togolese entomologist and Professor of Animal Biology at the University of Lomé
- Gilbert Houngbo, Prime Minister of Togo from 2008 to 2012, earned his Master of Business Administration at the University of Lomé.
- Sandra Ablamba Johnson, Secretary General of the Presidency and Governor of Togo at the World Bank.
