= Islamic University of Niger =

University in Say, Niger

Coordinates: 13.137°N 2.340°E

Islamic University in Niger
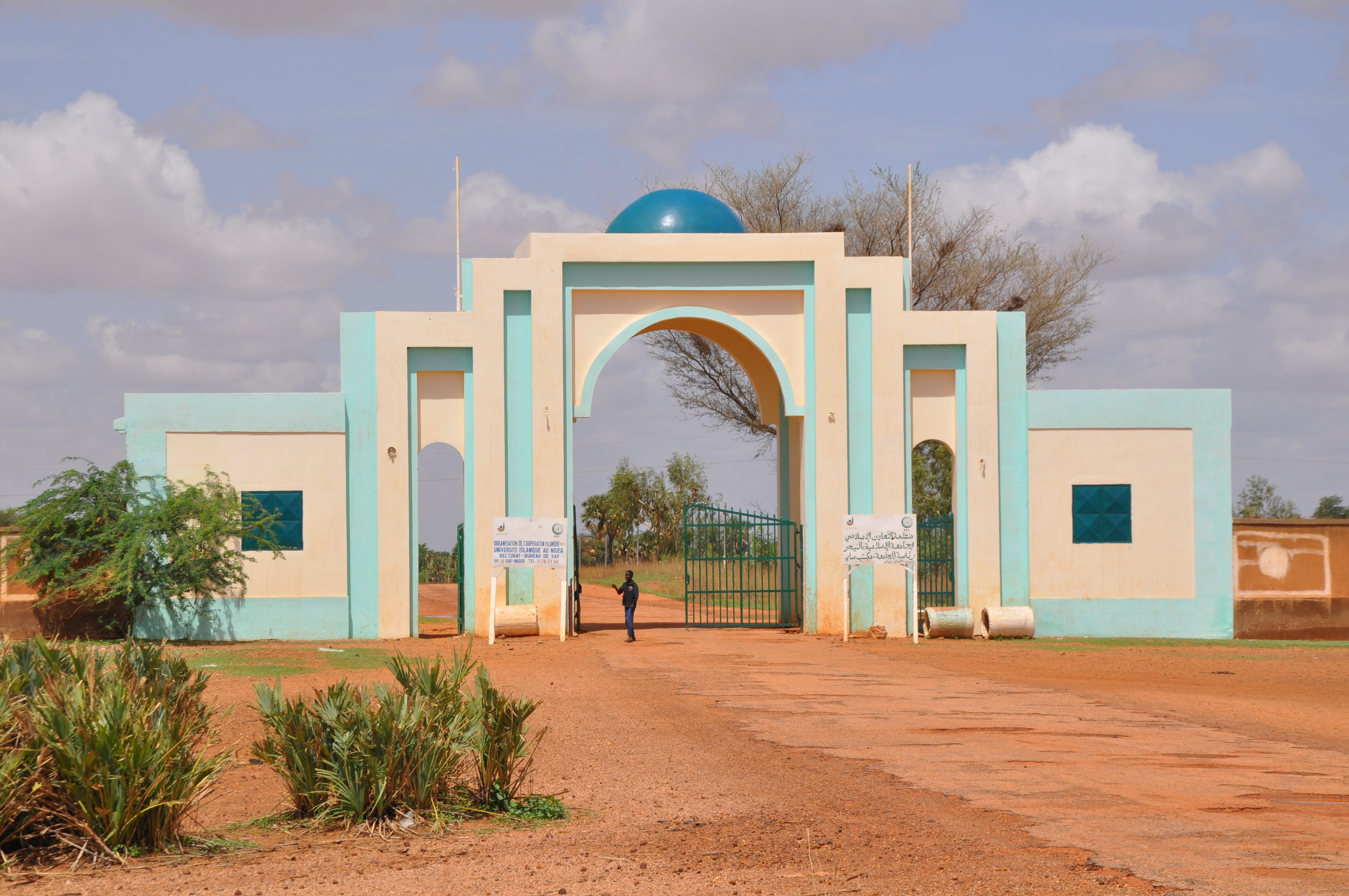
- Islamic University at Say, main gate
- Type: University
- Location: Say, Niger

The Islamic University in Niger (IUIN) is an international university in Say, Niger. Students and faculty study in Arabic, French, and English.

The university's vice-chancellor's office is in Niamey.

== History ==
IUIN began following recommendations at the 2nd Islamic Summit of Kings and Heads of States and governments in 1974 (52 years ago) at Lahore (Pakistan).

It was meant to become one of the leading research and educational establishments responding to the needs of the Muslim Ummah in West Africa and the Muslim world in general, by producing and promoting a new generation of Muslims, technically and morally equipped to face the challenges of the world.

It started its activities in 1986 with approximately 100 students majoring in Arabic language and Islamic studies. The IUIN is a member of the Federation of the Universities of the Islamic World (FUIW).

== Structure ==
Degree programmes are offered in five faculties, two centers, and two institutes.

=== Faculty ===
- Faculty of Sharia and Law
- Faculty of Arabic Language and Human Science
- Faculty of Science and Technology
- Faculty of Economics and Management
- Faculty of Agronomy

=== Institutes ===
- Higher Education Institute for Teachers’ Training and Pedagogy
- The Institute IQRA for Vocational and Technical Center at Lesser Level

== Publications ==
The university publishes the Annals of the Islamic University of Niger.

== See also ==
- List of Islamic educational institutions
- Islamic University in Uganda
- Organisation of Islamic Cooperation
- Education in Niger
- List of universities in Niger
