= Nabila Aghanim =

Algerian cosmologist

Nabila Aghanim is an Algerian observational cosmologist whose research concerns the interpretation of the cosmic microwave background and the light it sheds on galaxy formation and evolution, and the structure of galaxy filaments and the warm–hot intergalactic medium. She works in France as a director of research for the French National Centre for Scientific Research (CNRS), associated with the Institut d'astrophysique spatiale at the University of Paris-Saclay.

== Education and career ==
Aghanim is originally from Algiers. After completing a Diplôme d'études supérieures in Algeria, at the University of Science and Technology Houari Boumediene, she traveled to France for doctoral research in astrophysics at Paris Diderot University. Her 1996 dissertation, Contribution a l'etude des anisotropies secondaires du fond de rayonnement cosmologique, was directed by Jean-Loup Puget.

Aghanim's postdoctoral research at the University of California, Berkeley was cut short after six months by difficulty obtaining a visa to stay in the US for longer, because of the Algerian Civil War. Instead, after continuing her research at the National Centre for Space Studies in France, she became a CNRS researcher in 1999. She was promoted to director of research in 2010. In 2016, she was named as the director of the Observatoire des sciences de l'univers of the University of Paris-Saclay.

== Recognition ==
Aghanim received the CNRS Bronze Medal in 2005, and the CNRS Silver Medal in 2017. She was the 2022 winner of the Huy Duong Bui grand prize of the French Academy of Sciences.
