= Aïssata Moumouni =

Nigerien educator and politician (1939–2021)

Minister of National Education
- In office 21 December 1996 – 9 April 1999
- President: Ibrahim Baré Maïnassara
- Preceded by: Bouli Ali Diallo

Minister of Social Affairs and Women
- In office 1989 – 10 September 1991
- President: Ali Saibou
- Succeeded by: Aïssata Bagna

Personal details
- Born: 19 October 1939
- Died: 21 June 2021 (aged 81)
- Spouse: Abdou Moumouni Dioffo
- Occupation: Teacher, politician

Aïssata Moumouni (19 October 1939 – 21 June 2021) was a Nigerien teacher and politician, who served multiple times as a minister. A member of the Nigerien Women's Association, she was also the first woman in the country to be a member of a government.

== Biography ==
Born in 1939, Aïssata Moumouni pursued higher education in France and later earned a doctorate in mathematics in 1983 from Paris Diderot University, with a dissertation titled Study of Some Pedagogical and Linguistic Problems Concerning the Teaching of Mathematics in Niger.

A teacher and founder of a private school in Niamey in the mid-1980s, and a member of the Nigerien Women's Association (AFN), she was appointed in 1987 as Secretary of State for Public Health, Social Affairs, and Women's Affairs, making her the first woman to be a member of the government in her country. Two years later, she became the first female minister by serving as Minister of Social Affairs and Women from 1989 to 1991, and later as Minister of National Education from 1996 to 1999. She was married to Abdou Moumouni Dioffo, the first agrégé in physical sciences in Francophone Africa and a specialist in alternative energy. She died in June 2021.
