= Harmonious set =

In mathematics, a harmonious set is a subset of a locally compact abelian group on which every weak character may be uniformly approximated by strong characters. Equivalently, a suitably defined dual set is relatively dense in the Pontryagin dual of the group. This notion was introduced by Yves Meyer in 1970 and later turned out to play an important role in the mathematical theory of quasicrystals. Some related concepts are model sets, Meyer sets, and cut-and-project sets.

== Definition ==
Let Λ be a subset of a locally compact abelian group G and Λ_{d} be the subgroup of G generated by Λ, with discrete topology. A weak character is a restriction to Λ of an algebraic homomorphism from Λ_{d} into the circle group:

$$\chi: \Lambda_d\to\mathbf{T}, \quad
\chi\in\operatorname{Hom}(\Lambda_d,\mathbf{T}).$$

A strong character is a restriction to Λ of a continuous homomorphism from G to T, that is an element of the Pontryagin dual of G.

A set Λ is harmonious if every weak character may be approximated by strong characters uniformly on Λ. Thus for any ε > 0 and any weak character χ, there exists a strong character ξ such that

$$\sup_\Lambda |\chi(\lambda)-\xi(\lambda)| \leq \epsilon, \quad
\chi\in\operatorname{Hom}(\Lambda_d,\mathbf{T}), \xi\in\hat{G}.$$

If the locally compact abelian group G is separable and metrizable (its topology may be defined by a translation-invariant metric), then harmonious sets admit another, related, description. Given a subset Λ of G and a positive ε, let M_{ε} be the subset of the Pontryagin dual of G consisting of all characters that are almost trivial on Λ:

$$\sup_\Lambda|\chi(\lambda)-1| \leq \epsilon, \quad
\chi\in\hat{G}.$$

Then Λ is harmonious if the sets M_{ε} are relatively dense in the sense of Besicovitch: for every ε > 0 there exists a compact subset K_{ε} of the Pontryagin dual such that

$$M_\epsilon + K_\epsilon = \hat{G}.$$

== Properties ==
- A subset of a harmonious set is harmonious.
- If Λ is a harmonious set and F is a finite set then the set Λ + F is also harmonious.

The next two properties show that the notion of a harmonious set is nontrivial only when the ambient group is neither compact nor discrete.

- A finite set Λ is always harmonious. If the group G is compact then, conversely, every harmonious set is finite.
- If G is a discrete group then every set is harmonious.

== Examples ==
Interesting examples of multiplicatively closed harmonious sets of real numbers arise in the theory of diophantine approximation.

- Let G be the additive group of real numbers, θ >1, and the set Λ consist of all finite sums of different powers of θ. Then Λ is harmonious if and only if θ is a Pisot number. In particular, the sequence of powers of a Pisot number is harmonious.
- Let K be a real algebraic number field of degree n over Q and the set Λ consist of all Pisot or Salem numbers of degree n in K. Then Λ is contained in the open interval (1,∞), closed under multiplication, and harmonious. Conversely, any set of real numbers with these 3 properties consists of all Pisot or Salem numbers of degree n in some real algebraic number field K of degree n.

== See also ==
- Almost periodic function
