= University of Science and Technology Houari Boumediene =

Algerian university of science and technology

Coordinates: 36.716°N 3.183°E

University of Science and Technology Houari Boumedienne
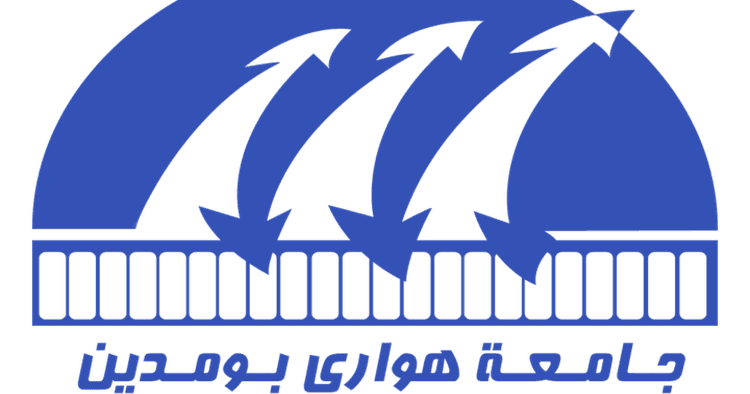
- Motto: Synergy between Science and Technology
- Motto in English: USTHB en été.jpg
- Type: Public
- Established: 25 April 1974; 52 years ago
- President: Djamal Eddine Akretche
- Students: 28111 for 2010–2011
- Undergraduates: 25615
- Postgraduates: 2496
- Location: Bab Ezzouar, Algiers, Algeria
- Colors: Blue
- Website: www.usthb.dz

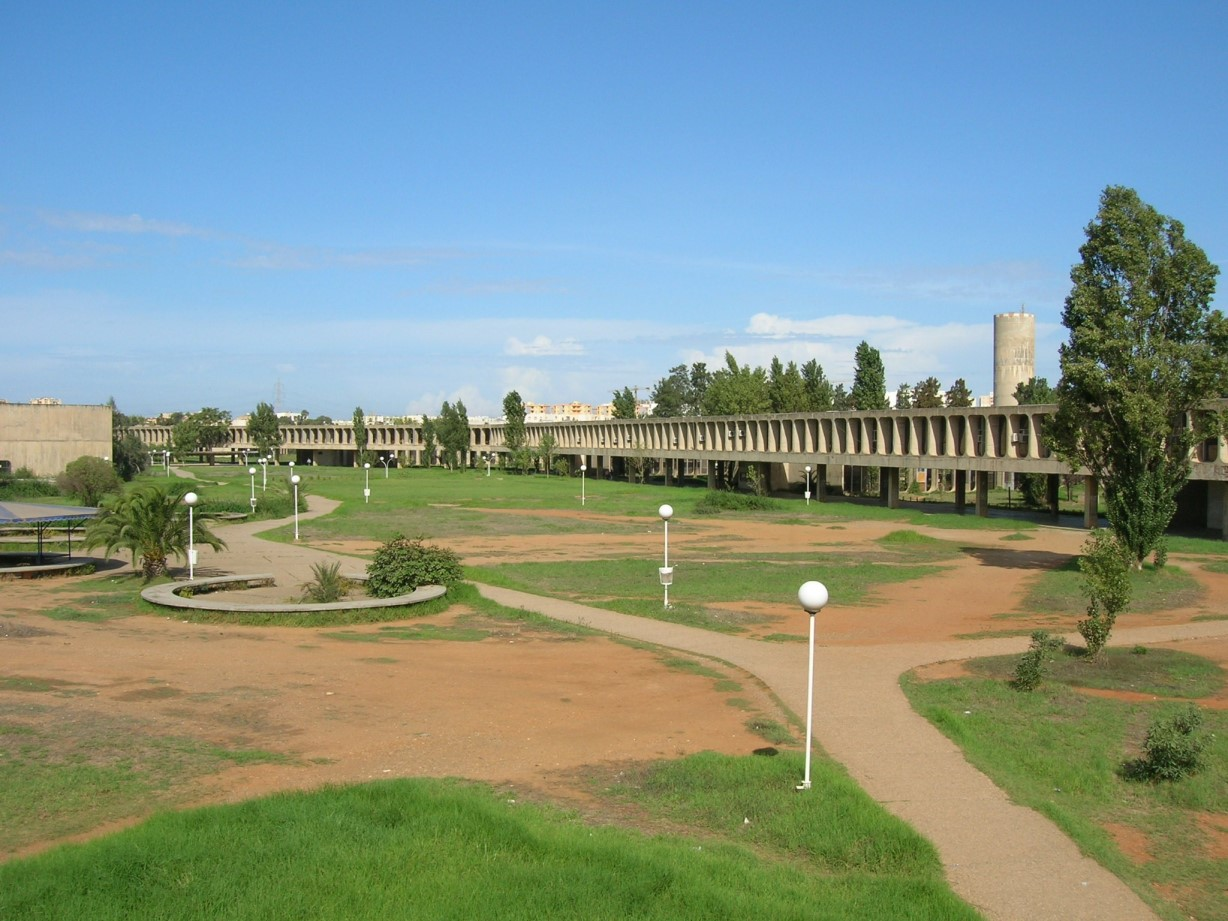
University of Science and Technology Houari Boumediene (2010)

The University of Science and Technology – Houari Boumediene (French: Université des sciences et de la technologie Houari-Boumediene, USTHB, Arabic: جامعة العلوم والتكنولوجيا هواري بومدين) is a university located in the town of Bab-Ezzouar 15 kilometres (9.3 mi) from Algiers, Algeria. The university was designed by Brazilian architect Oscar Niemeyer and was inaugurated in 1974.

Courses offered include Computing, Pure and Applied Mathematics, Physics, Chemistry, Biology, Geology, Civil Engineering, Electronics, Information Technology, Process Engineering, and Mechanical Engineering.

USTHB was the largest university in Algeria until 2013; it has over 20,000 students. The government's five-year plan aiming at raising the number of university students in Algeria from 1.2 million in 2010 to 2 million students in 2014 has led to the construction of new universities and faculties in almost every Algerian town; some universities are now larger than the USTHB in the number of enrolled students.

USTHB collaborates with western universities. Agreements exist between the faculties and their counterpart in France, Quebec Canada and other countries for the purpose of training and research. A number of Arab and African students receive grants to study in the USTHB.

The language of instruction began transition to English in 2025. Since then, L1 students have received exams and PDF course materials exclusively in English, For higher levels, such as L2 and L3, teachers use a mixture of French and English in their teaching and course materials.

== Campus ==
The university campus includes:

- The Rectorate: Offices of the Rector and the four Vice-Rectors, the university’s General Secretariat, central academic services, and the audiovisual center.
- The Faculties: Each of the eight faculties has research laboratories, practical work laboratories, a faculty administration (Dean, Vice-Deans, Heads of Departments), a faculty research library, and various service offices.
- Teaching facilities: Teaching spaces are organized in:
  - Two "classroom blocks": groups of lecture and tutorial rooms commonly known as the 100 and 200 (Block A), and the 300 and 400 (Block B).
  - Twenty-four amphitheaters (of various capacities), named from A′ to Z′.
  - Two practical work buildings No. 1 and No. 2 (each with 40 laboratory rooms and 16 classrooms).
- The University Library, which includes a large study area on the first floor and a lending section on the ground floor.
- The Computer Resources Center (CRI), managing the university’s intranet and internet networks.
- The University Village, which includes:
  - a 700-seat multipurpose hall,
  - a canteen,
  - a bookstore run by the National University Publications Office,
  - a post office,
  - a cybercafé called La Mezzanine, offering 100 Internet terminals for students in their 5th year and above,
  - a Wi-Fi study room open to students,
  - cultural and sports activity rooms: a music club, an art club, a games club, and an operations research club.
- Preventive Medicine Unit: located near the 300′ classroom blocks.
- The Auditorium: covering an area of 3,276 m^{2} (35,260 sq ft), it includes a 1,800-seat conference hall and an exhibition space. The auditorium hosts major university events and educational screenings.
- The “Omnisports” Hall, which supports indoor sports activities (basketball, handball, volleyball).
- A Francophone Digital Campus: located in the Computer Resources Center and intended for distance education, reserved for postgraduate students.
- The Internet Space: a new cyber area with more than 500 high-speed computers.
- The Intensive Language Teaching Center (CEIL): a group of language laboratories, mainly for English teaching, currently housed in the classroom Block A.
- The Graduate Employment Observatory (Observatoire de l’insertion des diplômés de l’USTHB), which functions as:
  - a service coordinating the work of the faculties’ internship and graduate tracking units;
  - a decision-making tool for the university, faculties, and program managers:
    - the results of surveys contribute to reflection on the university’s mission, strategy, and curriculum development;
  - a source of information on the professional opportunities related to the programs offered at the university.

The main mission of the Graduate Employment Observatory is to collect, analyze, and disseminate information about the professional integration of university graduates. It also aims to strengthen the link between education and employment by:

- Conducting studies and surveys on graduates’ professional integration;
- Providing relevant data to support action plans that improve training–employment alignment;
- Promoting an employment-oriented culture.

== Academic system ==
=== Classical system ===
The former academic structure was divided into two systems:

- Short-cycle system: training leading to the DEUA – Diplôme d’études universitaires appliquées (equivalent to higher technician degrees), lasting 3 years (BAC + 3). Top graduates could continue into the long-cycle system.
- Long-cycle system: starting with a common core (lasting 1 to 2 years), followed by specialization leading to either a DES – Diplôme d’études supérieures (4 years total, BAC + 4) or a State Engineering degree (5 years total, BAC + 5). This stage was called the “graduation” level.

Postgraduate studies were accessible through a national exam for the Magister degree (usually 2 years), open to DES or State Engineer graduates depending on available options and places.

Holders of the Magister could then apply, under specific criteria, for a Doctorat d’État or Doctorat ès Sciences to pursue a research career.

=== LMD system ===
In 2006, the university replaced the former structure with the new LMD system (Licence–Master–Doctorate):

- The Licence: a 3-year program (BAC + 3), offered as either academic or professional tracks.
- The Master’s degree: a 2-year program (BAC + 5) accessible to Licence holders under internal selection; also offered as academic or professional tracks.
- The Doctorate: open to Master’s graduates through a national exam, with a 3-year duration (BAC + 8).

== University organization ==
The university consists of eight faculties:

- Faculty of Biological Sciences – FSB;
  - Department of Cellular and Molecular Biology (BCM)
    - Laboratory of Cellular and Molecular Biology (LBCM)
      - Biochemistry of Biomolecules: mechanisms, immunotherapy, and immunodiagnostics
      - Biochemistry & Extracellular Matrix Remodeling
      - Cytokines & NOSynthase
      - Developmental Genetics
      - Molecular Genetics
      - Microbiology
      - Pharmacology & Cellular Signaling
  - Department of Organismal Biology and Physiology (BPO)
    - Laboratory of Organismal Biology and Physiology
  - Department of Ecology and Environment (EE)
    - Laboratory of Plant Ecology and Environment (LEVE)
    - Laboratory of Biological Oceanography and Marine Environment (LOBEM)
    - Laboratory for Research on Biodiversity and Environment: Interactions, Genomes (LRBE)
    - Laboratory for Research on Arid Zones (LRZA)
    - Laboratory of Dynamics and Biodiversity (LDB)
- Faculty of Chemistry – FC;
- Faculty of Physics – FP;
- Faculty of Mathematics – FM;
- Faculty of Civil Engineering – FGC;
- Faculty of Electrical Engineering – FGE (electronics, electrotechnics, telecommunications, instrumentation, and computer science);
- Faculty of Earth Sciences, Geography and Land Planning – FSTGAT;
- Faculty of Mechanical and Process Engineering – FGMGP.

== University library ==
The University Library is located in the center of the campus. In 1974, when the university first opened, temporary library rooms were arranged in the classroom blocks.

In 1986, the new library building was officially inaugurated.

The library covers 7,000 m^{2} (75,000 sq ft) over two levels and includes:

- A 1,200-seat reading room;
- An Internet access area;
- A room reserved for faculty and postgraduate students;
- Various services (general administration, IT, acquisition, cataloging, and guidance) and storage facilities.

Each faculty also has a small library administratively linked to the central library.

== Sports ==
USTHB has a martial arts club run by volunteers, and an agreement with the Olympic complex for the use of the Olympic swimming pool by the university students. It has a football team, and the USTHB basketball team participated in the National Collegiate Athletic competition. It also has many small student run sports clubs such as Club Riders USTHB; which frequently organizes bike riding events as well as kayaking events in the university's artificial lake.

Many prominent Algerian athletes are students of the university such as karate player Louisa Abourich; which had won the bronze medal in the 2026 karate one premier league Rabat in the category Female Kumite -55kg.

== Ranking ==
In 2025, according to U.S. News & World Report The university is the 2nd best in Algeria, the 1967th in the world, and the 91st in Africa. The computer science faculty was ranked the 945th best university for computer science in the world. The engineering faculties ranked the university as the 1053rd best university in the world in engineering majors

== Notable people ==
=== Alumni ===
Many prominent Algerian figures in science, politics, and culture have studied at USTHB.

- Noureddine Melikechi — Atomic, molecular, and optical physicist.
- Belgacem Haba — Microelectronics researcher.
- Nabila Aghanim — Astrophysicist, Director of Research at the CNRS.
- Yasmine Belkaid — Immunologist, Senior Investigator at the NIAID.
- Mohamed Arkab — Engineer and politician.
- Baâziz Achour — Telecommunications engineer (Qualcomm).
- Hamza Bendelladj — Computer scientist / hacker.
- Faïrouz Malek — Particle physicist, researcher at the CNRS involved in CERN experiments.

== See also ==
List of Oscar Niemeyer works
