= Albert Cohen (mathematician) =

French mathematician

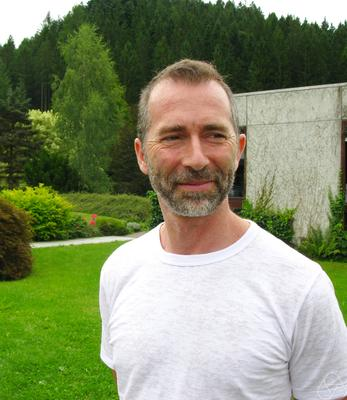
Albert Cohen

Albert Cohen (born 29 June 1965 in Paris) is a French mathematician, specializing in approximation theory, numerical analysis, and digital signal processing.

== Biography ==
He is, through maternal descent, the grand-nephew of the physicist Jacques Solomon. From 1984 to 1987 Albert Cohen was a student at the École Polytechnique. In 1990 he defended his doctoral thesis at Paris Dauphine University. His thesis, written under the supervision of Yves Meyer, is entitled Ondelettes, analyse multi résolution et traitement numérique du signal (Wavelets, multiresolution analysis and digital signal analysis) From 1990 to 1991 Cohen was a postdoc at Bell Laboratories at Murray Hill. He completed his habilitation in 1992 at Paris Dauphine University. From 1993 to 1995 he worked at ENSTA Paris. Since 1995 he has been a professor at the Laboratoire Jacques-Louis Lions of Pierre and Marie Curie University (Paris 6), which is a component of Sorbonne University. He is the author of 3 books and the author of co-author of over 100 research articles.

Cohen developed in 1990, with Ingrid Daubechies and Jean-Christophe Feauveau, the first biorthogonal bases for wavelets; this research has an important application in the image compression standard JPEG-2000. With Wolfgang Dahmen and Ronald DeVore, Cohen then worked on the analysis of nonlinear and adaptive approximation methods, with a view to applications in learning theory and in numerical analysis of partial differential equations. He is interested in algorithmic problems involving a very large number of variables, which cause a prohibitive increase in the complexity of calculations. These problems arise in statistical learning theory, in the treatment of parametric and stochastic partial differential equations, and in the development of response surfaces from computer software involving adaptive numerical methods.

In 2000 Cohen received the grand prix Jacques Herbrand from the French Academy of Sciences. In 1995 he won the V. A. Popov Prize in approximation theory from the University of South Carolina and in 2004 the prix Blaise Pascal from the French Academy of Sciences. He was elected in 1998 a junior member and in 2013 a senior member of the Institut Universitaire de France. He was an invited speaker at the International Congress of Mathematicians (ICM) in Beijing in 2002, a plenary speaker at the International Congress on Industrial and Applied Mathematics (ICIAM) in Zurich in 2007, and an invited speaker at the conference Dynamics, Equations and Applications in Kraków in 2019.

In 2013 Cohen was awarded an ERC Advanced Grant for a project called BREAD (Breaking the curse of dimensionality in analysis and simulation ).

== Selected publications ==
=== Articles ===
- Barron, Andrew R.; Cohen, Albert; Dahmen, Wolfgang; Devore, Ronald A. (2008). "Approximation and learning by greedy algorithms". The Annals of Statistics. 36. arXiv:0803.1718. doi:10.1214/009053607000000631. S2CID 2634835.
- Cohen, Albert; DeVore, Ronald (2015). "Approximation of high-dimensional PDEs". Acta Numerica. 24: 1–159. arXiv:1502.06797. doi:10.1017/S0962492915000033. MR 3349307. S2CID 31110343.
- Cohen, Albert (2018). "A journey through the Mathematics of Yves Meyer". In Helge Holden; Ragni Piene (eds.). The Abel Prize 2013-2017. Springer International Publishing. pp. 645–701. ISBN 978-3-319-99027-9; xi+774 pages
- Cohen, Albert; Dahmen, Wolfgang; DeVore, Ron (2020). "State Estimation -- the Role of Reduced Models". arXiv:2002.00220 [math.NA].
- Cohen, Albert; Dahmen, Wolfgang; Mula, Olga; Nichols, James (2020). "Nonlinear reduced models for state and parameter estimation". arXiv:2009.02687 [math.NA].

=== Books ===
- Cohen, Albert (1992). Ondelettes et traitement numérique du signal. Recherches en mathématiques appliquées, 25. Paris: Masson.
- Cohen, Albert (September 1995). Wavelets and Multiscale Signal Processing. Springer. ISBN 9780412575907; translated by Robert D. Ryan
- Cohen, Albert (2003). Numerical analysis of wavelet methods. Studies in mathematics and its applications Vol. 32. Amsterdam: Elsevier. ISBN 0-444-51124-5; pbk, 354 pages Cohen, A. (13 May 2003). 2003 hbk edition. Elsevier Science. ISBN 978-0-444-51124-9.
