= University of Diffa =

- Université de Diffa
- Type: Public university
- Established: 2014
- Rector: Ali Mahamane
- Undergraduates: Licence
- Postgraduates: Master
- Doctoral students: Doctorate
- Location: Diffa, Diffa Region; 13.32°N 12.62°E
- Website: www.univ-diffa.ne

The University of Diffa (UDA) is a public university located in Diffa, Niger, approximately 1,355 km (842 mi) east of Niamey.

== History ==
The project to create four universities (Agadez, Diffa, Dosso, Tillabéri) was adopted by the council of ministers on 10 April 2014 and subsequently unanimously approved by the deputies of the National Assembly. The university was officially established by law n° 2014-40 on 19 August 2014.

== Specialization ==
Given the region's challenges with desertification and the drying up of Lake Chad, the University of Diffa specializes in environmental issues. Additionally, due to insecurity caused by the Boko Haram insurgency in the Lake Chad basin, the university undertakes numerous activities promoting peace to support the efforts of public authorities in the region.

== Composition ==
As of 2015, the university comprises an Institute of Higher Education in Environment and Ecology (IS2E) and a Faculty of Agronomic Sciences (FSA). It also includes four technical services: an Ecological and Environmental Monitoring Unit, a Mutualized Cell, a Peace and Development Unit, and a Quality Assurance Cell.
