= Mariama Mamane =

Nigerien environmental activist

- Born: Niger River
- Education: University of Niamey
- Organization: Jacigreen
- Known for: Agricultural and ecological engineering

Mariama Mamane is an environmentalist and engineer from Niger.

Mamane founded Jacigreen company and won several innovation prizes for her work to improve the ecology of rivers.

== Early life and education ==
Mamane was born to a mother who holds a master's degree in life and earth sciences.

Mamane grew up by the Niger River in her home city of Niamey, and as of 2020 was living in Burkina Faso. She holds a degree in biodiversity and environmental management from University of Niamey.

== Career ==
In 2016, Mamane won the Entrepreneurial Journey prize from International Institute for Water and Environmental Engineering (also known as 2iE) and founded the company Jacigreen and registered it in Ouagadougou. Jacigreen works to turn invasive hyacinth into agricultural fertiliser and compost and biogas. The biogas is used in generators to create electricity.

In 2016, Mamane also won the jury's favourite prize at the African Rethink Awards.

In 2017, Mamane was awarded the United Nations Environment Programme Young Champions of the Earth Prize. The prize was worth $15,000.
