= Jacques Herbrand Prize =

The Jacques Herbrand Prize (French: Prix Jacques Herbrand) is an award given by the French Academy of Sciences to young researchers (up to 35 years) in the fields of mathematics and physics, and their non-military applications. The prize was created in 1996, and first awarded in 1998. In 2001, it was renamed the Grand Prix Jacques Herbrand . From 1998 until 2002, both a mathematics prize and a physics prize were awarded every year; from 2003 until 2021, a mathematrics prize was awarded in odd numbered years and a physics prize in even ones; in 2022, the earlier protocol was reinstated. As of 2015, winners were awarded €15,000; this sum was later increased to €20,000. The prize is named after the French logician Jacques Herbrand (1908-1931).

== Recipients ==
- 1998: Loïc Merel, mathematics; Franck Ferrari, physics
- 1999: Laurent Manivel, mathematics; Brahim Louis, physics
- 2000: Albert Cohen (mathematician), mathematics; Philippe Bouyer, physics
- 2001: Laurent Lafforgue, mathematics; Yvan Castin, physics
- 2002: Christophe Breuil, mathematics; Pascal Salière, physics
- 2003: Wendelin Werner, mathematics
- 2004: Nikita Nekrasov, physics
- 2005: Franck Barthe, mathematics
- 2006: Maxime Dahan, physics
- 2007: Cédric Villani, mathematics
- 2008: Lucien Besombes, physics
- 2009: Artur Ávila, mathematics
- 2010: Julie Grollier, physics
- 2011: Nalini Anantharaman, mathematics
- 2012: Patrice Bertet, physics
- 2013: David Hernandez (mathematician), mathematics
- 2014: Aleksandra Walczak, physics
- 2015: Cyril Houdayer, mathematics
- 2016: Yasmine Amhis, physics
- 2017: Hugo Duminil-Copin, mathematics
- 2018 : Alexei Chepelianskii, physics
- 2019 : Nicolas Curien, mathematics
- 2020 : Basile Gallet, physics
- 2021 : Olivier Benoist, mathematics
- 2022 : Igor Ferrier-Barbut, mathematics, and Emmanuel Flurin, physics
- 2023 : Kestutis Cesnavicius, mathematics, and Vivian Poulin-Détolle, physics
- 2024 : Omar Mohsen, mathematics, Guillaume Michel, physics

== See also ==
- Herbrand Award — by the Conference on Automated Deduction, for contributions in the field of automated deduction
- List of mathematics awards
- List of physics awards
