= Djoher Amhis-Ouksel =

Algerian writer (1928–2025)

- جوهر أمحيص أكسيل
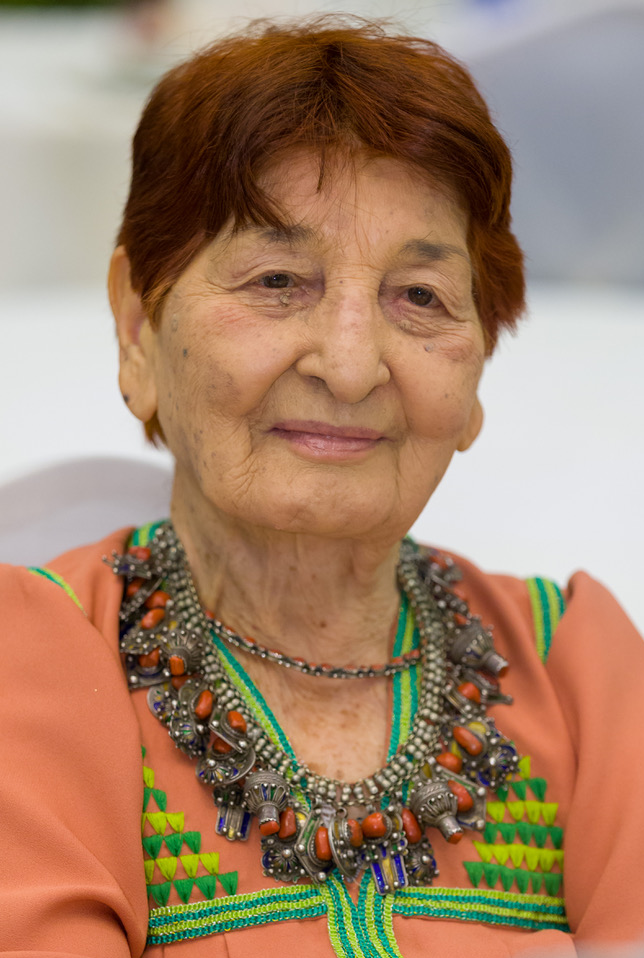
- Amhis-Ouksel in 2022
- Born: 1928; Aït Yenni, French Algeria
- Died: 5 June 2025 (aged 96–97); Algiers, Algeria
- Occupation: Writer
- Relatives: Yasmine Amhis (granddaughter)

Djoher Amhis-Ouksel (Arabic: جوهر أمحيص أكسيل; 1928 – 5 June 2025) was an Algerian writer who wrote in French and Berber. She was notably the grandmother of physicist Yasmine Amhis.

== Life and career ==
Born in Aït Yenni in 1928, Amhis-Ouksel attended teaching school in Miliana before becoming a teacher in Thénia and Médéa. She briefly served as inspector of national education before her return to teaching in Algiers.

In 1983, Amhis-Ouksel began a series of works covering the novels of Mouloud Mammeri, Mohammed Dib, Mouloud Feraoun, Malek Ouary, Taos Amrouche, Abdelhamid ben Hadouga, Tahar Djaout, Assia Djebar, and Kateb Yacine. Most of these books were published by Casbah éditions. For her work covering Algeria's literary heritage, she received the Prix Mahfoud-Boucebci in 2012 and the Prix de la fondation Nedjma in 2013. In 2016, a documentary titled Djoher Amhis, une femme d'exception was released, which covered her exceptional contributions to Algerian literature and was directed by M'hamed Amrouche. She wrote her autobiography, Le Chant de la sitelle, in 2012.

Amhis-Ouksel died in Algiers on 5 June 2025.

== Works ==
- Le Prix de l'honneur. Une lecture de " Le Grain dans la meule" de Malek Ouary (2007)
- D'une rive à l'autre. Une lecture de "La Terre et le Sang" et "Les Chemins qui montent" de Mouloud Feraoun (2009)
- Taâssast. Une lecture de "La Colline oubliée" de Mouloud Mammeri (2011)
- La Voie des ancêtres. Une lecture de "Sommeil du Juste" de Mouloud Mammeri (2012)
- Dar Sbitar. Une lecture de "La Grande Maison" de Mohammed Dib (2012)
- Le Chant de la sitelle (2012)
- L'Exil et la Mémoire. Une lecture des romans de Taos Amrouche (2013)
- Benhadouga, la vérité, le rêve, l'espérance (2013)
- Tahar Djaout, ce tisseur de lumière (2013)
- Mimouni, l'écrivain témoin et conscience (2015)
- Assia Djebar, une figure de l'aube (2016)
