= Meyer wavelet =

Orthogonal wavelet

Spectrum of the Meyer wavelet (numerically computed).

The Meyer wavelet is an orthogonal wavelet proposed by Yves Meyer. As a type of a continuous wavelet, it has been applied in a number of cases, such as in adaptive filters, fractal random fields, and multi-fault classification.

The Meyer wavelet is infinitely differentiable with infinite support and defined in frequency domain in terms of function $\nu$ as

$$\Psi(\omega) := \begin{cases}
\frac {1}{\sqrt{2\pi}} \sin\left(\frac {\pi}{2} \nu \left(\frac{3|\omega|}{2\pi} -1\right)\right) e^{j\omega/2} & \text{if } 2 \pi /3<|\omega|< 4 \pi /3, \\
\frac {1}{\sqrt{2\pi}} \cos\left(\frac {\pi}{2} \nu \left(\frac{3| \omega|}{4 \pi}-1\right)\right) e^{j \omega/2} & \text{if } 4 \pi /3<| \omega|< 8 \pi /3, \\
0 & \text{otherwise},
\end{cases}$$

where

$$\nu (x) := \begin{cases}
0 & \text{if } x < 0, \\
x & \text{if } 0< x < 1, \\
1 & \text{if } x > 1.
\end{cases}$$

There are many different ways for defining this auxiliary function, which yields variants of the Meyer wavelet. For instance, another standard implementation adopts

$$\nu (x) := \begin{cases}
x^4 (35 - 84x + 70x^2 - 20x^3) & \text{if } 0 < x < 1, \\
0 & \text{otherwise}.
\end{cases}$$

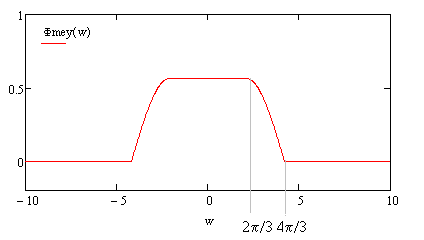
Meyer scale function (numerically computed)

The Meyer scaling function is given by

$$\Phi(\omega) := \begin{cases}
\frac{1}{\sqrt{2\pi}} & \text{if } | \omega| < 2 \pi/3, \\
\frac{1}{\sqrt{2\pi}} \cos\left(\frac{\pi}{2} \nu \left(\frac{3|\omega|}{2\pi} - 1\right) \right)  & \text{if } 2\pi/3 < |\omega| < 4\pi/3, \\
0 & \text{otherwise}.
\end{cases}$$

In the time domain, the waveform of the Meyer mother-wavelet has the shape as shown in the following figure:

waveform of the Meyer wavelet (numerically computed)

== Closed expressions ==
Valenzuela and de Oliveira give the explicit expressions of Meyer wavelet and scale functions:

$$\phi(t) = \begin{cases}
\frac{2}{3} + \frac{4}{3\pi} & t = 0, \\
\frac{\sin(\frac{2\pi}{3}t) + \frac{4}{3}t\cos(\frac{4\pi}{3}t)}{\pi t - \frac{16\pi}{9}t^3} & \text{otherwise},
\end{cases}$$

and

$$\psi(t) = \psi_1(t) + \psi_2(t),$$

where

$$\psi_1(t) = \frac{\frac{4}{3\pi}(t - \frac12)\cos[\frac{2\pi}{3}(t - \frac12)] - \frac{1}{\pi}\sin[\frac{4\pi}{3}(t - \frac12)]}{(t - \frac12) - \frac{16}{9}(t - \frac12)^3},$$
$$\psi_2(t) = \frac{\frac{8}{3\pi}(t - \frac12)\cos[\frac{8\pi}{3}(t - \frac12)] + \frac{1}{\pi}\sin[\frac{4\pi}{3}(t - \frac12)]}{(t - \frac12) - \frac{64}{9}(t - \frac12)^3}.$$
