= List of universities in Niger =

This is a list of universities in Niger.

== Institutions ==
- Abdou Moumouni University
- Annahda International University
- Aboubacar Ibrahim International University
- African Development University
- Higher Institute of Mining, Industry and Geology
- Institut Pratique de Santes Publiquee
- Islamic University of Niger
- Maryam Abacha American University Niger
- Université canadienne du Niger
- Jibril Oumar University of Agadez
- Université Dan Dicko Dankoulodo de Maradi
- Université de Diffa
- Université de Dosso
- Université de Tillabéri
- Université de Zinder
- Université Djibo Hamani de Tahoua (UDH)
- Université libre de Maradi
- Université populaire de Niamey
- universite de Annahda maradi
