= Meyer set =

In mathematics, a Meyer set or almost lattice is a relatively dense set X of points in the Euclidean plane or a higher-dimensional Euclidean space such that its Minkowski difference with itself is uniformly discrete. Meyer sets have several equivalent characterizations; they are named after Yves Meyer, who introduced and studied them in the context of diophantine approximation. Nowadays Meyer sets are best known as mathematical model for quasicrystals. However, Meyer's work precedes the discovery of quasicrystals by more than a decade and was entirely motivated by number theoretic questions.

== Definition and characterizations ==
A subset X of a metric space is relatively dense if there exists a number r such that all points of X are within distance r of X, and it is uniformly discrete if there exists a number ε such that no two points of X are within distance ε of each other. A set that is both relatively dense and uniformly discrete is called a Delone set. When X is a subset of a vector space, its Minkowski difference X − X is the set {x − y | x, y in X} of differences of pairs of elements of X.

With these definitions, a Meyer set may be defined as a relatively dense set X for which X − X is uniformly discrete. Equivalently, it is a Delone set for which X − X is Delone, or a Delone set X for which there exists a finite set F with X − X ⊂ X + F

Some additional equivalent characterizations involve the set

$$X^\epsilon = \{y\mid |x\cdot y - 1| \le\varepsilon \text{ for all } x\in X\}$$

defined for a given X and ε, and approximating (as ε approaches zero) the definition of the reciprocal lattice of a lattice. A relatively dense set X is a Meyer set if and only if

- For all ε > 0, X^{ε} is relatively dense, or equivalently
- There exists an ε with 0 < ε < 1/2 for which X^{ε} is relatively dense.

A character of an additively closed subset of a vector space is a function that maps the set to the unit circle in the plane of complex numbers, such that the sum of any two elements is mapped to the product of their images. A set X is a harmonious set if, for every character χ on the additive closure of X and every ε > 0, there exists a continuous character on the whole space that ε-approximates χ. Then a relatively dense set X is a Meyer set if and only if it is harmonious.

== Examples ==
Meyer sets include

- The points of any lattice
- The vertices of any rhombic Penrose tiling
- The Minkowski sum of another Meyer set with any nonempty finite set
- Any relatively dense subset of another Meyer set
