= Faïrouz Malek =

Algerian particle physicist

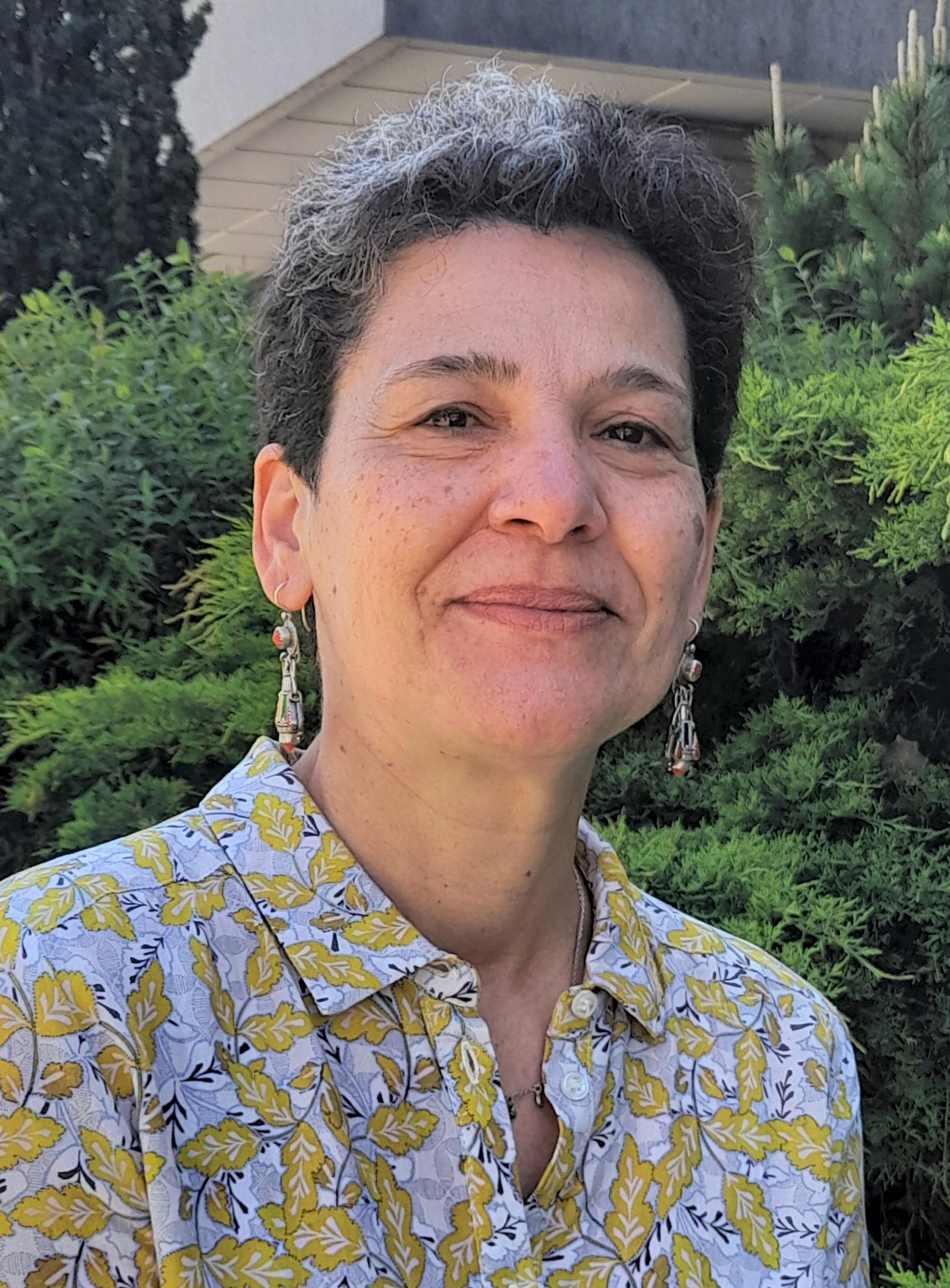
- Born: March 6, 1964 (age 62); Algiers
- Education: University of Science and Technology Houari Boumediene; Université Grenoble Alpes
- Scientific career
- Fields: Physics; Particle physics Nuclear physics Cosmology; Computing
- Workplaces: French National Centre for Scientific Research
- Thesis: Étude de la fission des hypernoyaux (1990)

Faïrouz Malek is a French and Algerian physicist specializing in nuclear physics, particle physics and cosmology. A research scientist at the French National Centre for Scientific Research, she is involved in international research at the CERN LHC. She has contributed to the discovery of the Higgs boson. She is also known for her commitment to gender parity in science, as well as to the development of science in Africa. She is fellow of the African Academy of Sciences. She is the niece of Algerian composer Ahmed Malek.

== Early life and education ==
Malek studied at Algiers Omar Racim High School and graduated in physics at the University of Science and Technology Houari Boumediene. Malek earned a PhD in nuclear and particle physics at Université Grenoble-Alpes (former Joseph Fourier University), where she worked on the fission of hypernuclei.

== Research and career ==
Malek was member of an experiment at CERN, which research was about the quark–gluon plasma, a physics state observed in 2000. This state of matter is frequently compared to the primordial soup that existed shortly after the Big Bang.

Malek has contributed to the Alpha Magnetic Spectrometer detector concept, an apparatus which flew and was installed in the International Space Station to search for the anti-matter in space.

Malek joined the ATLAS experiment at CERN in 2000. She was leading the Grenoble group who were responsible for the design and prototyping of the Liquid Argon (LAr) Calorimeter and was the scientific leader of the French WLCG grid-computing infrastructure. Together with the worldwide ATLAS experiment collaborators, she contributed to the discovery of the Higgs boson, announced in 2012.

Malek was President of the Alps branch of the French Physics Society, Société Française de Physique (SFP) from 2000 to 2002. Member of the European Physical Society since 2007, she served in the "physics for development group" during four years (2010-2014). She also served in the "Physics for development Committee (C13)" of the International Union of Pure and Applied Physics (IUPAP) organization from 2009 to 2015.

=== Physics for development in Africa ===
In 2019, Malek and Kétevi Assamagan, published an opinion letter to address the issue of the absence of the African continent in worldwide science and technology prospects, particularly in fondamental physics. Shortly after, in 2020, Malek co-founded with Kétevi Assamagan among others, the "African Strategy for Fundamental and Applied Physics", seeking to identify priorities, directions and means for the scientific research, education and capacity building for the African continent. In 2022, she was invited to join the African Synchrotron Initiative Think Tank, initiated by the African Academy of Sciences, in view to set up a Pan-African Synchrotron facility and gave a talk on that subject at the 14th African Academy of Sciences General Assembly.

=== Gender parity in science ===
Malek is involved in equity and inclusion in science activities. She founded and was the first president of the Association pour la Parité dans les Métiers Scientfiques et Techniques (Parité Science) in 2002. She contributes to projects and activities to promote women scientists, within the French national association Femmes et Sciences as well as within the European Platform for Women Scientists (EPWS). She coordinated the exhibition "La Science Taille XX elles" to promote women scientists, in Grenoble area.

== Distinctions ==
- From 2000 to 2002, she served as president of the Alpes branch of the French Physics Society
- On the occasion of the 60th anniversary of CERN, her profile was presented, among other scientists, at the Palais de la Découverte, from October 17, 2014 to July 19, 2015 in the exhibition "Experts in the field - Views on CERN ” as well as on the “CERN 360° Experience”
- In 2020, she was distinguished fellow of the African Academy of Sciences

== Selected publications ==
Malek has authored or co-authored more than 1200 articles, most of which deal with the physics of the ATLAS experiment. Among all of these articles, 18 have been cited more than 500 times.

=== Articles and book chapters ===
- Michèle Leduc, Faïrouz Malek et Roger Maynard, Reflets de la physique, May 2007
- Faïrouz Malek, Reflets de la physique, July- August 2010
- Faïrouz Malek, Micro Hebdo, 2010
- Faïrouz Malek, Reflets de la Physique, October 2011
- Faïrouz Malek, Pour la Science, 25 October 2013
- Faïrouz Malek, Book chapter, CNRS Editions, 2017, 368 p. (ISBN 978-2-271-11464-8), « Le CERN et les Big Data »
