= Aboubakr Belkaid =

Algerian politician (1934–1995)

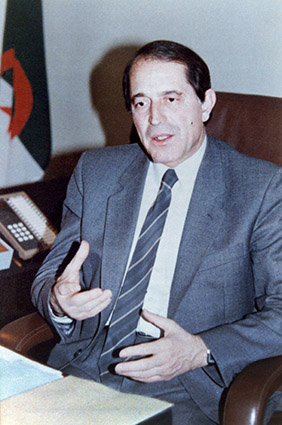
- Born: 19 March 1934; Tlemcen
- Died: September 28, 1995 (aged 61); Algiers
- Cause of death: Assassination

Aboubakr Belkaid (1934–1995), sometimes spelled Abou Bekr Belkaid, (in Arabic: أبو بكر بلقايد), was an Algerian politician born on 19 March 1934 in Tlemcen. He held several ministerial positions between 1965 and 1992 and was assassinated on September 28, 1995, in Port Saïd Square in Algiers.

On his tomb at the cemetery of El Alia in Algiers, the following words are inscribed: "The battles that we lose are the ones that we do not engage in."

== Biography ==
=== Algerian War ===
He began his activism at the age of 15 and joined the MTLD in 1949. He joined the FLN at its creation in 1954 where he held various responsibilities. He was notably a member of the Secretariat of the General Association of Algerian Workers (AGTA) and a member of the Federation of France of the FLN. He worked as a worker at Régie Renault, where he was a delegate to the Works Council. He became Coordinator of the Collective of Lawyers responsible for the defense of detainees and internees. Arrested in France in 1961, he was detained at Fresnes prison until April 1962, when he was released in accordance with the Evian Accords of March 19, 1962.

=== Post-independence ===
Disagreeing with the conditions under which the seizure of power took place, he participated in the first opposition to the nascent regime. He was one of the founding members of the first opposition party created in May 1962 and held a position within the secretariat of this party under the direction of Mohamed Boudiaf, the Party of the Socialist Revolution (PRS). Barely escaping the arrest of PRS leaders decided by the government of the time, he plunged back into hiding and pursued opposition action, on behalf of the PRS, until the creation of the FFS of Hocine Aït Ahmed. Arrested at the end of 1963, he was released after an agreement was reached between part of the FFS leadership and the government.

=== Assassination ===
Aboubakr Belkaid was assassinated during the Civil War on September 28, 1995 at Port Saïd Square. The terrorist attack was carried out by elements operating in the Basse-Casbah under the orders of Hocine Flicha, whose real name was Khelifi Athmane.

== See also ==
- Yasmine Belkaid (his daughter)
