= Yasmine Belkaid =

Algerian immunologist (born 1968)

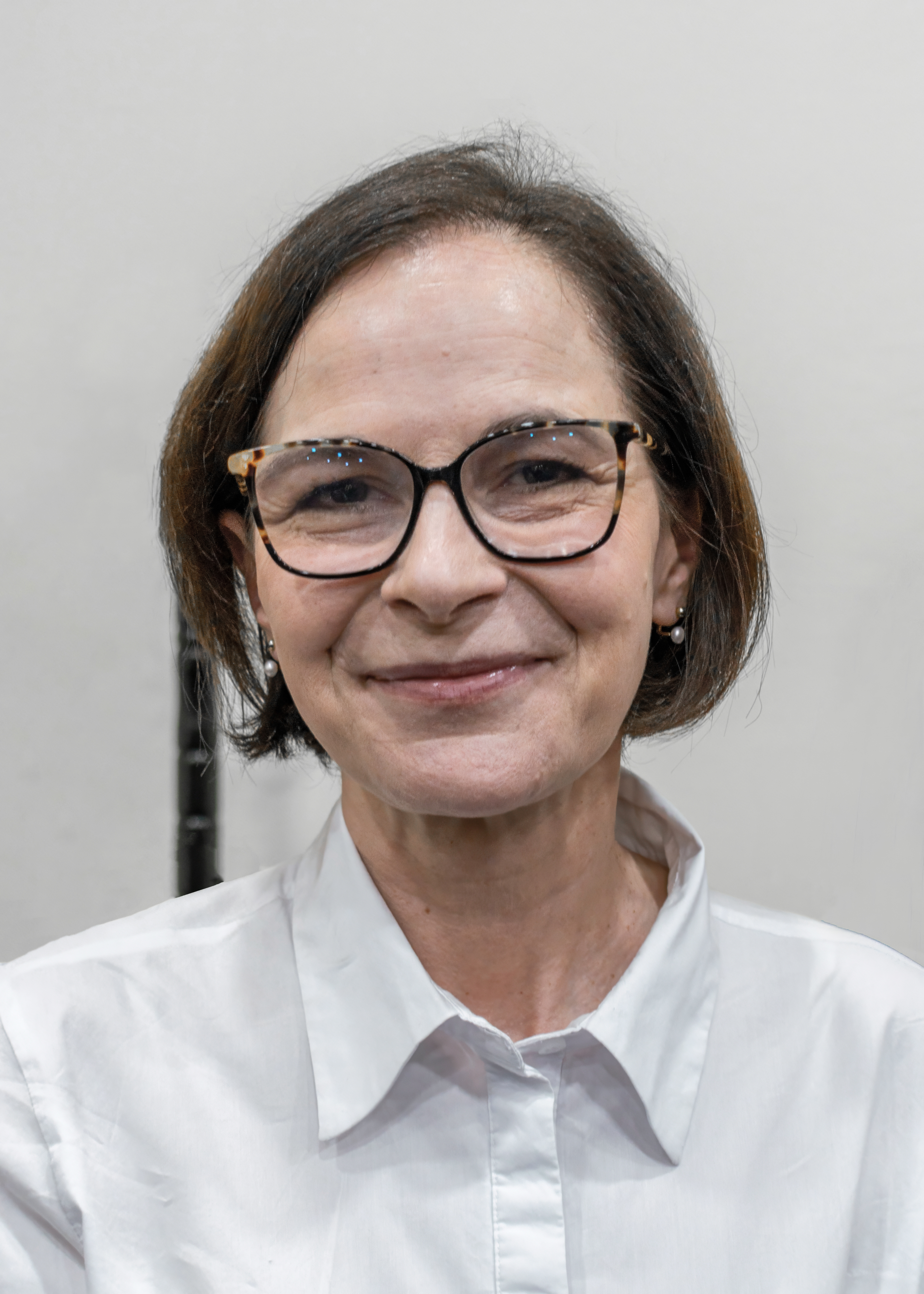
- Belkaid in 2024
- Born: 1968 (age 57–58); Algiers, Algeria
- Education: University of Sciences and Technology Houari Boumediene; University of Paris-Sud; Pasteur Institute
- Known for: Microbiome
- Awards: Sanofi-Pasteur Award
- Scientific career
- Fields: Immunology, Microbiology
- Workplaces: National Institute of Allergy and Infectious Diseases; University of Pennsylvania

Yasmine Belkaid (Arabic: ياسمين بلقايد; born 1968) is an Algerian immunologist who is best known for her work studying host-microbe interactions in tissues and immune regulation to microbes. Belkaid currently serves as the director of the NIAID Microbiome program. On March 29, 2023, she was appointed as President of the Pasteur Institute for a six-year term, starting from January 2024. She is the daughter of the former Algerian politician Abu Bekr Belkaid.

== Early life and education ==
Belkaid was born and raised in Algiers, Algeria. Her father was Algerian politician Aboubakr Belkaid, who was assassinated on September 28, 1995, during the Black Decade. She received her bachelor's and master's degrees in biochemistry from the University of Sciences and Technology Houari Boumediene (Note: During her studies, Belkaid worked at the Pasteur Institute of Algeria, where she was responsible for improving diagnostic methods for leishmaniasis.) as well as a Master of Advanced Studies from University of Paris-Sud. She earned her doctorate in immunology from the Pasteur Institute in 1996, where she studied innate immune responses to Leishmania infection.

== Career ==
=== Academia ===
Following graduate school, she moved to the United States for a postdoctoral fellowship at NIAID's Laboratory of Parasitic Diseases. In 2002, she joined the faculty of the Division of Molecular Immunology in Cincinnati Children's Hospital Medical Center before returning to NIAID in 2005 as Head of the Mucosal Immunology Unit in the Laboratory of Parasitic Diseases. In 2008, she became adjunct Professor of Pathology and Laboratory Medicine at the University of Pennsylvania.

=== Research ===
Yasmine Belkaid, accompanied by her mother, was the guest of honor for the 50th anniversary of Abou Bekr Belkaid University in Tlemcen, named in memory of her late father.

Belkaid's research focuses on untangling the mechanisms underlying host-microbe interactions in the gastrointestinal tract and on the skin, which are natural barrier sites between the host's inner workings and their external environment. This also includes the role microbiota play in promoting immunity against infection against other harmful pathogens. Her group has contributed to the scientific understanding of how the host immune system can distinguish good microbes from the bad.

Belkaid's research also led to the discovery of certain skin microbes that play an important role in immune defense. They carried out this experiment using mice that had no naturally occurring microbes in their skin or gut so they could colonize those mice with only one strain of "good" bacteria. They then infected the colonized and bacteria-free mice with a parasite and found that those without the "good" bacteria were unable to fight back against the parasite, while those with the bacteria mounted an effective immune response. Her team has also found that beneficial bacteria living on the surface of the skin can also accelerate wound healing in mice. Belkaid's group also studies what happens when there are imbalances in our microbiome. Belkaid's research has advanced scientific understanding of how shifts in microbiota can contribute to disease, particularly chronic inflammatory diseases like Crohn's disease and Psoriasis.

== Awards and honors ==
- 2013 – Gold Medal, International Union of Biochemistry and Molecular Biology
- 2016 – Sanofi-Pasteur International Mid-career Award
- 2016 – Elected Fellow, American Academy of Microbiology
- 2017 – Emil von Behring Prize
- 2017 – Elected to the National Academy of Sciences
- 2018 – Elected to the National Academy of Medicine
- 2019 – Lurie Prize in Biomedical Sciences, Foundation for the National Institutes of Health
- 2020 – Elected to the American Academy of Arts and Sciences
- 2021 – Robert Koch Prize
- 2024 – Arab Genius Award
- 2025 – Foreign Member of the Royal Society
- 2026 – Louis-Jeantet Prize
