= Adamu Abubakar Gwarzo =

- Born: January 1, 1978 (age 48); Lagos, Nigeria
- Occupations: Academic, educational administrator
- Known for: Founder of Maryam Abacha American University
- Title: President, MAAUN Group of Universities

Academic background
- Education: Bayero University Kano

Adamu Abubakar Gwarzo (born 1 January 1978) is a Nigerian academic and media executive who founded the Maryam Abacha American University (MAAUN) Group.

== Early life and education ==
Gwarzo was born in Lagos State, Nigeria, into an indigene family from Gwarzo Local Government Area of Kano State. He completed his primary and secondary schooling in Kano before attending Bayero University Kano, where he completed a Bachelor of Arts degree in French Language. He later earned a master's degree and a PhD in French Linguistics.

== Career ==
Early in his career, Gwarzo worked as a bilingual journalist across news organizations in West Africa.

In 2013, he established the Maryam Abacha American University of Niger in Maradi, Niger Republic, operating as a private bilingual institution. He later expanded the entity to Nigeria by establishing the Maryam Abacha American University of Nigeria in Kano, which received a provisional license from the National Universities Commission (NUC) in 2021.

On 4 October 2023, the university group's Board of Trustees appointed Gwarzo as President of the MAAUN Group of Universities.

== Philanthropy ==
Through the Adamu Abubakar Gwarzo Foundation, he funds university scholarships for students in West Africa and supports local health infrastructure in Northern Nigeria.
