= Kirtachi =

Coordinates: 12°48′N 2°29′E

- Commune and village
- Interactive map of Kirtachi
- Country: Niger

Area
  - Total: 430 sq mi (1,120 km^{2})

Population (2012 census)
  - Total: 39,693
  - Density: 91.8/sq mi (35.4/km^{2})
- Time zone: UTC+1 (WAT)

Kirtachi is a village and rural commune in Niger. As of 2012, it had a population of 39,693.
