= Ketevi Assamagan =

African American engineer and physicist

Kétévi Adiklè Assamagan
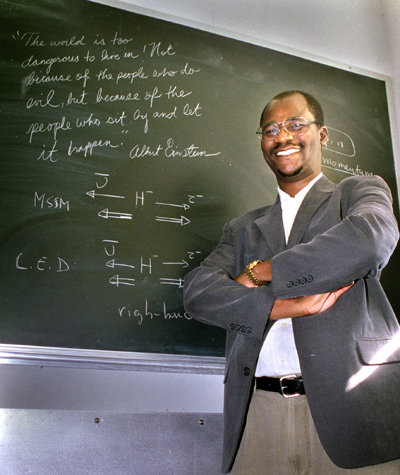
- Assamagan with an Albert Einstein quote
- Born: Gabon
- Education: Southern Illinois University; University of Lomé
- Scientific career
- Workplaces: Brookhaven National Laboratory; Hampton University; Paul Scherrer Institute
- Thesis: A precise determination of the pion beta decay rate : design and calibration

Kétévi Adiklè Assamagan is an African American physicist at the Brookhaven National Laboratory. He was elected a Fellow of the American Physical Society in 2021. Assamagan founded the African School of Physics.

== Early life and education ==
Assamagan was born in Port-Gentil Gabon, and moved to Togo at the age of 4. He was an undergraduate student at the University of Lomé. After earning his bachelor's degree in Physics and Chemistry he was awarded a scholarship from the African-American Institute to study in the United States, where he joined the Southern Illinois University. He eventually started a graduate studies at Ball State University. His Master's research involved the development of a two-dimensional analytical model of a solar concentrator. After earning his master's degree, he moved to the University of Virginia, where he worked toward a doctorate in particle physics. During his doctorate he worked at the Paul Scherrer Institute.

== Research and career ==
Assamagan was appointed to Hampton University where he worked on the Continuous Electron Beam Accelerator Facility. He eventually moved to the ATLAS experiment in CERN. His research considers physics beyond the Standard Model. He moved to Brookhaven National Laboratory in 2001, where he worked on the physics analysis tools for ATLAS. He was made coordinator for the software of the Muon Spectrometer. He was part of the ATLAS Collaboration when they first observed the Higgs boson in 2012.

Assamagan is co-founder of the African School of Physics, a non-profit school training African researchers in fundamental physics and applications. In 2019, he co-funded with Fairouz Malek, Simon Connel and others, the African Strategy for Fundamental Physics. He was elected to the African Academy of Sciences in 2019 and the American Physical Society in 2021.

== Selected publications ==
- ATLAS Collaboration; CMS Collaboration; Aad, G.; Abbott, B.; Abdallah, J.; Abdinov, O.; Aben, R.; Abolins, M.; AbouZeid, O. S.; Abramowicz, H.; Abreu, H. (2015-05-14). "Combined Measurement of the Higgs Boson Mass in 𝑝⁢𝑝 Collisions at √𝑠=7 and 8 TeV with the ATLAS and CMS Experiments". Physical Review Letters. 114 (19) 191803. arXiv:1503.07589. doi:10.1103/PhysRevLett.114.191803. PMID 26024162. S2CID 1353272.
- Frolov, V. V.; Adams, G. S.; Ahmidouch, A.; Armstrong, C. S.; Assamagan, K.; Avery, S.; Baker, O. K.; Bosted, P.; Burkert, V.; Carlini, R.; Davidson, R. M. (1999-01-04). "Electroproduction of the 𝛥⁡(1232) Resonance at High Momentum Transfer". Physical Review Letters. 82 (1): 45–48. arXiv:hep-ex/9808024. doi:10.1103/PhysRevLett.82.45. S2CID 119517972.
- ATLAS Collaboration. Measurements of the Higgs boson production and decay rates and constraints on its couplings from a combined ATLAS and CMS analysis of the LHC pp collision data at s√=7 and 8 TeV. OCLC 1188701893.
- Assamagan, Ketevi Adikle (2017-11-04). Citizen and Traveler. African Travelers Press. ISBN 978-0-692-97479-7.

== Personal life ==
Assamagan plays African drums.
