= Jibril Oumar University of Agadez =

Public university in Agadez, Niger

Université Jibril Oumar d'Agadez, formerly known as the Université d'Agadez, is a public university in Agadez, Niger. Established on 19 August 2014, the university began academic activities in October 2015. The university offers programmes in science, technology, engineering and related fields, including electrical engineering, energy engineering, chemistry, mathematics, renewable energy and agriculture in arid zones.

== History ==
=== Establishment ===
The University of Agadez was established in 2014 as part of an expansion of public higher education in Niger. The university was created under Law No. 2014-40 of 19 August 2014, which also established other public universities in the country. Ibrahim Natatou was appointed the university's founding rector on 16 January 2015 and began his duties in February of that year. Academic activities commenced in October 2015.

=== Early facilities ===
At the beginning of its operations, the university was housed at the École des Mines de l'Aïr in Agadez. It later used classrooms in several secondary schools in the city to accommodate teaching activities. In August 2026, it received two equipped classrooms donated by Groupe SOS.

=== Renaming ===
On 9 October 2026, Niger's Council of Ministers adopted a draft decree proposing new names for three public universities, including the University of Agadez.

Under the proposed change, the University of Agadez was to be named Jibril Oumar University of Agadez, abbreviated UJO, in honour of Cheikh Jibril Ibn Oumar, an Islamic scholar from Agadez who lived in the 18th century.

== Academics ==
The university's academic programmes offers science, technology, engineering and applied disciplines. In 2015 - 2016, 150 students were recordrd

== Administration ==
Ibrahim Natatou was the university's founding rector, and was appointed in January 2015. Mahaman Moustapha Adamou succeeded him in July 2022, and Sama Arjika was appointed rector in August 2023.
