= Education in Niger =

Educational oversight
- Ministry of National Education: Rabiou Ousman

General details
- Primary languages: French

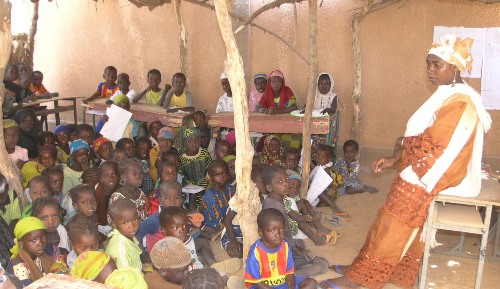
A primary classroom in Niger

Education in Niger, as in other nations in the Sahelian region of Africa, faces challenges due to poverty and poor access to schools. Although education is compulsory between the ages of seven and fifteen, with primary and secondary school leading into optional higher education, Niger has one of the lowest literacy rates in the world. With assistance from external organizations, Niger has been pursuing educational improvement, reforming how schools utilize languages of instruction, and exploring how the system can close gender gaps in retention and learning.

The Human Rights Measurement Initiative (HRMI) finds that Niger is fulfilling only 59.2% of what it should be fulfilling for the right to education based on the country's level of income. HRMI breaks down the right to education by looking at the rights to both primary education and secondary education. While taking into consideration Niger's income level, the nation is achieving 71.5% of what should be possible based on its resources (income) for primary education but only 46.8% for secondary education.

== Organization of formal education ==
Children in Niger enter primary school is at age seven. Schooling is then compulsory until age fifteen, at end of the 1st cycle of secondary school. The education system of Niger is organized as such:

- Pre-school (préscolaire)
- Primary school (enseignement primaire) (6 years)
- Secondary school (enseignement secondaire)
  - 1st cycle (4 years)
  - 2nd cycle (3 years)
- Higher education
  - University: license (3 years), master's (2 years), doctorate (3 years)
  - Technical institutes: DUT (University Technical Diploma Diplôme Universitaire de Technologie (2 years)

=== Primary education ===
Primary education is composed of six grades:

- C.I. (Cours d’Initiation or Initiation Class)
- C.P. (Cours Préparatoire or Preparatory Class)
- C.E.1 (Cours Élémentaire 1 or Elementary Class 1)
- C.E.2 (Cours Élémentaire 2 or Elementary Class 2)
- CM1 (Cours Moyen 1 or Middle Class 1)
- CM2 (Cours Moyen 2 or Middle Class 2)

Names of classes starting with CP come from the French system. CI was added to "initiate" students to the French language, which is the language of education in most schools.

Completion of primary school is sanctioned by a national exam. Successful candidates at the exam are awarded a certificate of completion of primary education or CFEPD (abbreviated from the French certificat de fin d'études du premier degré). The World Bank cites the UNESCO Institute for Statistics' current estimate of primary school enrollment at 71%, though this figure is inflated because it counts the many overage children who are still in primary school.

== Languages of Instruction ==
French was adopted as Niger's only official language in its first constitution in 1960, and was therefore the only language permitted in schools for a decade after independence. While the number of recognized national languages expanded to include 8 local languages in 1989, and 2 more in 2001, Niger's schools have been slow to implement multilingual education. This created educational barriers for students in Niger who spoke other regional languages and often had a limited grasp of French, leading to difficulty understanding materials taught in schools. Following a 1965 world conference on education in Tehran, where evidence from around the world showed failings in literacy education not conducted in the learner’s fluent language, Mali demonstrated greatly improved outcomes in literacy using local languages as part of mother-tongue-medium-education (MTME). Programs like this one gained global traction in this period, leading Niger to begin using local languages for school instruction in some schools as early as 1972. In fact, Niger was among the first to incorporate such programs in West Africa. In 2012, Niger made it mandatory to use the mother tongue spoken at home as the language of instruction in the early years of education.

=== Bilingual education reform ===
Even with early efforts being focused at multilingual and bilingual education in Niger, more consistent and widespread implementation of these methods has been decades in the making. In a 2005 study, experimental schools showed an exclusion or drop-out rate about 14 percent lower than traditional schools, and successful completion of primary education without repeats at a rate 17 percent higher than traditional schools. Following a 2008 curriculum reform initiative, Niger's Ministry of Education piloted a program in 500 schools featuring local languages for instruction in early grades and introducing French gradually in later years. This pilot was expanded to 5,000 schools for the 2017-2018 school year. Studies showed student performance was highest in bilingual schools and lowest in traditional (Francophone) schools. While evidence indicates favorable outcomes, bilingual and multilingual education has developed gradually in Niger, despite support for these programs originating in the early 1960s. Many complications remain in further implementing multilingual education in Niger, such as exclusively French-language national exams, French involvement in the language policy of former colonies, political motivations hindering more expansive programs, and financial limitations to successful implementation.

== Gender Inequality ==
Niger is ranked close to the bottom of the Human Development Reports' Gender Inequality Index, placed at 151 out of 189 countries. Access to education makes up part of this index's criteria, with figures showing educational disparities among an already undereducated general population. While only 23 percent of boys complete secondary school, the figure is even lower for girls at just 17 percent. At all levels of schooling, girls attend less than boys. Literacy rates also reflect educational inequality, with 23 percent of girls over the age of fifteen demonstrating literacy, compared to 39 percent of boys of the same age group. This inequality can be attributed to several factors, including safety concerns, long distances and lack of access to schools, cultural norms that prioritize education less for girls, and child marriage. The impact of gender inequality in Niger, which is partially driven by unequal access to education, extends beyond just the educational sphere. The World Bank estimates that by giving women more equal spending and earning power––specifically through investments in girls' education and reducing child marriage––Niger's GDP per capita could increase by up to a fourth. Gender inequality in education is therefore more than just an issue of principle for the nation, since it impacts the economic well-being of all.

=== Efforts to close the gender gap ===
Both educational authorities in Niger and international organizations have taken steps to address gender inequality in education. For example, the United States Agency for International Development and UNICEF have both pledged to assist Niger's government in making education more accessible for girls. And Niger's government has laid out a ten-year plan for the education sector from 2014 to 2024 committing to, among other things, incentivizing girls' enrollment and retention. While it remains to be seen exactly how successful implementation of these strategies will be by 2024, the program has been endorsed and supported by the United Nations Educational, Scientific and Cultural Organization.

== Tertiary education ==
There are five universities in Niger. The first and biggest, the Abdou Moumouni University in Niamey was founded as the University of Niamey in 1974. The Islamic University of Niger in Say was opened in 1986. In 2008, two public universities, the University of Zinder in Zinder and University of Maradi in Maradi were created. In 2010, the University of Tahoua or Universite de Tahoua was created in Tahoua. In 2014, it was announced that four additional universities will be created in Agadez, Diffa, Dosso and Tillaberi. The University of Agadez was established in 2014 and began academic activities in October 2015. In October 2026, it was renamed Jibril Oumar University of Agadez, in honour of the Islamic scholar Cheikh Jibril Ibn Oumar.

== See also ==
- List of universities in Niger
