= Abdou Moumouni University =

Public university in Niamey, Niger

Coordinates: 13°30′05″N 2°05′55″E

- Université Abdou Moumouni de Niamey
- Former name: University of Niamey
- Type: Public
- Established: 1974; 52 years ago
- Affiliations: Government of Niger; Ministry of Education
- Students: ~25000
- Location: Niamey, Niamey Capitol District
- Campus: Main: Harobanda Quarter BP 237/10896 Niamey, Niger
- Website: https://www.uam.edu.ne

Abdou Moumouni University (French: Université Abdou Moumouni de Niamey, UAM), formerly the University of Niamey from 1974 to 1994, is a public university based in Niamey, the capital of Niger. The main campus is situated on the right bank of the Niger River. Historically, its students and faculty have been involved in protest movements in the capital.

== Enrollment ==
The university currently has an enrollment of around 25,000 students.

== Name ==
The university is named after former Professor Abdou Moumouni Dioffo, a Nigerien educator, intellectual, and president of the university. From 1974 to 1994, the institution was known as the University of Niamey. The university was an outgrowth of the 1971 Centre d'enseignement supérieur, which consolidated a number of post-secondary and trade schools founded in the years following independence. Under French colonial rule, there were no post-secondary institutions in Niger.

== Structure ==
The Université Abdou Moumouni includes a wide array of public institutions. These include:

- Agronomy College, Université Abdou Moumouni, BP 10960, Niamey, Niger
  - Agronomy Faculty
  - Regional Center for Specialized Learning in Agriculture (Centre régional d'enseignement spécialisé en agriculture, CRESA)
  - Département productions animales, faculté d'agronomie (UAM/FA)
  - Département science du sol
- College of Arts and Sciences (Faculté des lettres et sciences humaines, FLSH), Université Abdou Moumouni de Niamey, BP 418, Niamey
  - Geography Department
- College of Science (Faculté des sciences), BP 10662, Niamey
  - Faculty of Science
  - Biology Department
  - Plant Biology Department
  - Geology Department
  - Center for Sahelian Research and Publication (Réseau sahélien de recherche et de publication, RESADEP)
  - Laboratory Garba Mounkaila of Biology (LGMB) 1996-
- Niamey Teachers College (École normale supérieure de Niamey), Université Abdou Moumouni, BP 10963, Niamey
- Radio-Isotopes Institute (Institut des radio-isotopes), Université Abdou Moumouni, B.P. 10727, Niamey
- National School of Public Health (École nationale de santé publique)
- National School of Engineering and Mines (Tillaberi, Tillaberi Region)
- Satellite campuses in Dosso and Zinder

Lamordé University Hospital is affiliated and many faculty and students practice medicine there.

=== IUTs ===
The University Institutes of Technology (Instituts Universitaires de Technologie, IUT) are tech schools in the regional capitals of Tahoua, Maradi, and Zinder created in October 2006, and operating from 2007 to 2008. In 2009 it was decided in the National Assembly that the campuses would be integrated into the Université Abdou Moumouni. In 2011, new universities were created in Maradi, Tahoua and Zinder to which the University Institutes of Technology were integrated.

The IUTs offer a degree, called the "Diplôme universitaire de technologie" (DUT), in a one- to two-year program for students who have completed a Baccalaureate or equivalent. Programs vary by location:

==== University Institute of Technology Maradi ====
Location: Maradi. Opened: October 2007.

- Business Studies (finance and banking, commerce and insurance, business formation and administration)
- Mechanical Engineering
- Information Engineering

==== University Institute of Technology Tahoua ====
Location: "Commune Tahoua I". Opened: November 2008.

- Agribusiness (agriculture, husbandry, forestry)
- Tanning/leather works
- Tourism and Hotel Management
- Electrical Engineering

==== University Institute of Technology Zinder ====
Location: Zinder. Opened: November 2008.

- Civil Engineering
- Hydrogeology/geology
- Topography
- City Planning

== Protests ==
=== 1990 massacre ===
On 9 February 1990, 20 students in a peaceful march across the Kennedy Bridge into Niamey City Centre were killed by police and armed forces. This event, known as the 'Kennedy Bridge Massacre', has since been seen as pivotal in bringing about popular alienation from the government of General Ali Saibou.

=== 2006 protests ===
In June 2006, the university temporarily closed due to protests and rioting. The Union des étudiants nigériens de l'Université de Niamey (UENUN) called a general strike against the alleged withholding of scholarships as well as the deterioration of living and working conditions at the university. Students clashed with police, lit 10 vehicles on fire, while police used tear gas and batons on the students to prevent them from crossing the Kennedy Bridge, seriously injuring 10.

== Notable people ==
=== Faculty ===
- Bouli Ali Diallo
- Antoinette Tidjani Alou

=== Alumni ===
- Mariama Mamane

== See also ==
- List of universities in Niger
- Education in Niger
