= List of Fourier analysis topics =

This is a list of Fourier analysis topics.

== Fourier analysis ==
- Multiplier (Fourier analysis)
- Fourier shell correlation
- Pinsky phenomenon

=== Fourier series ===
- Generalized Fourier series
- Regressive discrete Fourier series
- Gibbs phenomenon
- Sigma approximation
- Dini test
- Poisson summation formula
- Spectrum continuation analysis
- Convergence of Fourier series
- Half-range Fourier series

=== Fourier transforms ===
- List of Fourier-related transforms
- Fourier transform on finite groups
- Fractional Fourier transform
- Continuous Fourier transform
- Fourier operator
- Fourier inversion theorem
- Sine and cosine transforms
- Parseval's theorem
- Paley–Wiener theorem
- Projection-slice theorem
- Frequency spectrum

=== Discrete Fourier transforms ===
- Discrete Fourier series
- Non-uniform discrete Fourier transform
- DFT matrix
- Entropy influence conjecture
- Fast cosine transform
- Fast Fourier transform
- Cyclotomic fast Fourier transform
- Sparse Fourier transform

=== Applications of Fourier analysis ===
- Fourier amplitude sensitivity testing
- Fourier optics
- Quantum mechanics, for
  - Wavefunctions
  - Uncertainty principle
  - Quantum Fourier transform

== Algebra and analysis ==
- Periodic function
- Almost periodic function
- ATS theorem
- Modulus of continuity
- Banach algebra
- Compact group
- Haar measure
- Hardy space
- Sobolev space
- Topological group

=== Harmonic analysis ===
- Set of uniqueness
- Pontryagin duality
- Plancherel theorem
- Peter–Weyl theorem
- Fourier integral operator
- Oscillatory integral operator

=== Harmonic functions ===
- Laplace operator
- Laplace equation
- Dirichlet problem
- Unit circle
- Unit disc
- Spherical harmonic

=== Special functions and generalized functions ===
- Bessel function
- Dirac delta function
- Distribution
- Oscillatory integral

== Integral transform concepts ==
=== Transforms ===
- Laplace transform
- Discrete Hartley transform
- List of transforms

=== Integral kernels ===
- Dirichlet kernel
- Fejér kernel

=== Convolution ===
- Convolution theorem

== Analysis of unevenly spaced data ==
- Least-squares spectral analysis

== See also ==
- List of cycles
- list of Fourier-related transforms
- list of harmonic analysis topics
- LTI system theory
- Autocorrelation
- Autocovariance
- Whittaker–Shannon interpolation formula
- Gabor atom
- Marcinkiewicz theorem
- Nyquist–Shannon sampling theorem
- Riesz–Thorin theorem
