= List of harmonic analysis topics =

This is a list of harmonic analysis topics. See also list of Fourier analysis topics and list of Fourier-related transforms, which are more directed towards the classical Fourier series and Fourier transform of mathematical analysis, mathematical physics and engineering.

== Fourier analysis ==
=== Fourier series ===
- Periodic function
- Trigonometric function
- Trigonometric polynomial
  - Exponential sum
- Dirichlet kernel
- Fejér kernel
- Gibbs phenomenon
- Parseval's identity
- Parseval's theorem
- Weyl differintegral
- Generalized Fourier series
  - Orthogonal functions
  - Orthogonal polynomials
  - Empirical orthogonal functions
- Set of uniqueness

=== Fourier transform ===
- Continuous Fourier transform
- Fourier inversion theorem
- Plancherel's theorem
- Convolution
- Convolution theorem
- Positive-definite function
- Poisson summation formula
- Paley–Wiener theorem
- Sobolev space
- Time–frequency representation
- Quantum Fourier transform

== Topological groups ==
- Topological abelian group
- Haar measure
- Discrete Fourier transform
  - Dirichlet character
- Amenable group
  - Von Neumann's conjecture
- Pontryagin duality
- Kronecker's theorem on diophantine approximation
- Almost periodic function
- Bohr compactification
- Wiener's tauberian theorem

== Representation theory ==
- Representation of a Lie group
- Unitary representation
- Irreducible representation
- Harish-Chandra character
- Restricted representation
- Induced representation
- Peter–Weyl theorem
- Spherical harmonic
- Casimir operator
- Hecke operator
- Stone–von Neumann theorem
- Discrete series representation
- Tempered representation
- Langlands program

== Fast Fourier transform ==
- Bluestein's FFT algorithm
- Cooley–Tukey FFT algorithm
- Rader's FFT algorithm
- Number-theoretic transform
- Irrational base discrete weighted transform

== Analysis of unevenly spaced data ==
- Least-squares spectral analysis

== Applications ==
- FFT multiplication
- Spectral method
- Fourier transform spectroscopy
- Signal analysis
- Analytic signal
- Welch method
