= Landau kernel =

The Landau kernel is named after the German number theorist Edmund Landau. The kernel is a summability kernel defined as:

$$L_n (t) = \begin{cases}
\frac{(1-t^2)^n}{c_n} & \text{if } {-1} \leq t \leq 1\\
0 & \text{otherwise}
\end{cases}$$
where the coefficients $c_n$ are defined as follows:

$$c_n = \int_{-1}^1 (1-t^2)^n \, dt.$$

== Visualisation ==
Using integration by parts, one can show that:
$$c_n = \frac{(n!)^2 \, 2^{2n+1}}{(2n)! (2n+1)}.$$
Hence, this implies that the Landau kernel can be defined as follows:
$$L_n (t) = \begin{cases}
(1-t^2)^n \frac{(2n)! (2n+1)}{(n!)^2 \, 2^{2n+1}} & \text{for } t \in [-1,1]\\
0 & \text{elsewhere}
\end{cases}$$

Plotting this function for different values of n reveals that as n goes to infinity, $L_n(t)$ approaches the Dirac delta function as a distribution, as seen in the image, where the following functions are plotted.

== Properties ==
Some general properties of the Landau kernel is that it is nonnegative and continuous on $\mathbb{R}$. These properties are made more concrete in the following section.

=== Dirac sequences ===
Definition: Dirac sequence—A Dirac sequence is a sequence $(K_n)_{n \in \mathbb{Z}}$ of functions $K_n \colon \mathbb{R} \to \mathbb{R}$ that satisfies the following properities:

- $\forall n \in \mathbb{Z} \, \forall t \in \mathbb{R} \colon K_n(t) \geq 0$
- $\int_{-\infty}^\infty K_n (t) \, dt =1, \, \forall n$
- $\forall \varepsilon >0 \, \forall \delta >0 \, \exists N \in \mathbb{Z}_+ \, \forall n \geq N \colon$
  ${} \quad \int_{\mathbb{R} \smallsetminus [-\delta,\delta]}K_n(t) \, dt= \int_{-\infty}^{-\delta} K_n (t) \, dt + \int_\delta^\infty K_n (t) \, dt < \varepsilon$

The third bullet point means that the area under the graph of the function $y = K_n(t)$ becomes increasingly concentrated close to the origin as n approaches infinity. This definition leads us to the following theorem.

Theorem—The sequence of Landau kernels is a Dirac sequence

Proof: We prove the third property only. In order to do so, we introduce the following lemma:

Lemma—The coefficients satsify the following relationship, $c_n \geq \frac{2}{n+1}$

Proof of the Lemma:

Using the definition of the coefficients above, we find that the integrand is even, hence we may write
$$\frac{c_n}{2} = \int_{0}^1 (1-t^2)^n \, dt = \int_0^1 (1-t)^n(1+t)^n \, dt \geq \int_0^1 (1-t)^n \, dt = \frac{1}{1+n}$$
completing the proof of the lemma. A corollary of this lemma is the following:

Corollary—For all positive, real $\delta$: $\int_{\mathbb{R} \smallsetminus [-\delta,\delta]}K_n(t) \, dt \leq \frac{2}{c_n} \int_\delta^1 (1-t^2)^n \, dt \leq (n+1)(1-\delta^2)^n$

== See also ==
- Poisson kernel
- Fejér kernel
- Dirichlet kernel
