= Secure file transfer protocol =

The term secure file transfer protocol or secure FTP may refer to:

Network protocols

- SSH File Transfer Protocol — a file transfer protocol specifically developed by the IETF to run over secure shell connections
- FTP over SSH, also known as "secure FTP" — the practice of using SSH to tunnel the older, well-known File Transfer Protocol (FTP)

Computer programs

- Secure file transfer program, usually known as "sftp" — a well-known command-line program, common in Unix, for using SSH File Transfer Protocol
- Secure FTP (software) — a software package, by Glub Tech, for using FTPS (traditional FTP over SSL/TLS)

== See also ==
- FTPS — sometimes called "FTP Secure"
- SFTP (disambiguation)
- SFT (disambiguation)
