= Convergence of Fourier series =

Mathematical problem in classical harmonic analysis

In mathematics, the question of whether the Fourier series of a given periodic function converges to the given function is studied in classical harmonic analysis, a branch of pure mathematics. Convergence does not occur in the general case – certain criteria must be met.

Determination of convergence requires the comprehension of pointwise convergence, uniform convergence, absolute convergence, L^{p} spaces, summability methods and the Cesàro mean.

== Preliminaries ==
Consider f an integrable function on the interval [0, 2π]. For such an f the Fourier coefficients $\widehat{f}(n)$ are defined by the formula

$$\widehat{f}(n)=\frac{1}{2\pi}\int_0^{2\pi}f(t)e^{-int}\,\mathrm{d}t, \quad n \in \Z.$$

It is common to describe the connection between f and its Fourier series by

$$f \sim \sum_n \widehat{f}(n) e^{int}.$$

The notation ~ here means that the sum represents the function in some sense. To investigate this more carefully, the partial sums must be defined:

$$S_N(f;t) = \sum_{n=-N}^N \widehat{f}(n) e^{int}.$$

The question of whether a Fourier series converges is: Do the functions $S_N(f)$ (which are functions of the variable t we omitted in the notation) converge to f and in which sense? Are there conditions on f ensuring this or that type of convergence?

Before continuing, the Dirichlet kernel must be introduced. Taking the formula for $\widehat{f}(n)$, inserting it into the formula for $S_N$ and doing some algebra gives that

$$S_N(f)=f * D_N$$

where ∗ stands for the periodic convolution and $D_N$ is the Dirichlet kernel, which has an explicit formula,

$$D_n(t)=\frac{\sin((n+\frac{1}{2})t)}{\sin(t/2)}.$$

The Dirichlet kernel is not a positive kernel, and in fact, its norm diverges, namely

$$\int |D_n(t)|\,\mathrm{d}t \to \infty$$

a fact that plays a crucial role in the discussion. The norm of D_{n} in L^{1}(T) coincides with the norm of the convolution operator with D_{n}, acting on the space C(T) of periodic continuous functions (where T stands for a (one-dimensional) torus), or with the norm of the linear functional f → (S_{n}f)(0) on C(T). Hence, this family of linear functionals on C(T) is unbounded, when n → ∞.

== Magnitude of Fourier coefficients ==
In applications, it is often useful to know the size of the Fourier coefficient.

If $f$ is an absolutely continuous function,

$$\left|\widehat f(n)\right|\le {K \over |n|}$$

for $K$ a constant that only depends on $f$.

If $f$ is a bounded variation function,

$$\left|\widehat f(n)\right|\le {{\rm var}(f)\over 2\pi|n|}.$$

In particular, this applies to absolutely continuous functions, where ${\rm var}(f) = \|f'\|_1$.

If $f\in C^p$

$$\left|\widehat{f}(n)\right|\le {\| f^{(p)}\|_{L_1}\over |n|^p}.$$

If $f\in C^p$ and $f^{(p)}$ has modulus of continuity $\omega_p$,

$$\left|\widehat{f}(n)\right|\le {\omega(2\pi/n)\over |n|^p}$$

and therefore, if $f$ is in the α-Hölder class

$$\left|\widehat{f}(n)\right|\le {K\over |n|^\alpha}.$$

== Pointwise convergence ==
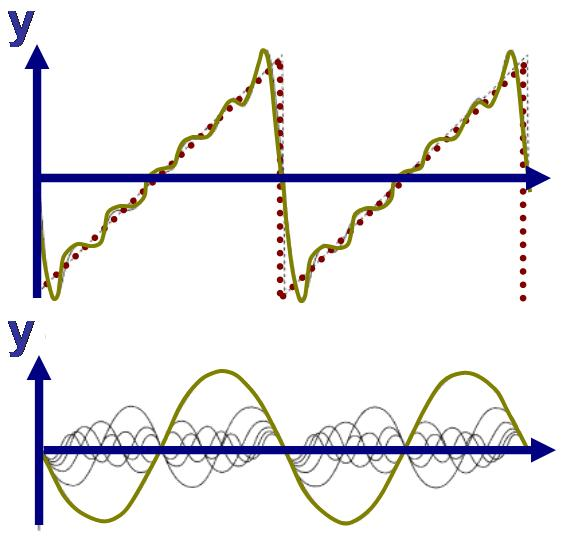
Superposition of sinusoidal wave basis functions (bottom) to form a sawtooth wave (top); the basis functions have wavelengths λ/k (k=integer) shorter than the wavelength λ of the sawtooth itself (except for k=1). All basis functions have nodes at the nodes of the sawtooth, but all but the fundamental have additional nodes. The oscillation about the sawtooth is called the Gibbs phenomenon

There are many known sufficient conditions for the Fourier series of a function to converge at a given point x, for example if the function is differentiable at x. Even a jump discontinuity does not pose a problem: if the function has left and right derivatives at x, then the Fourier series converges to the average of the left and right limits (but see Gibbs phenomenon).

The Dirichlet–Dini Criterion (see Dirichlet conditions and Dini test) states that: if ƒ is 2π–periodic, locally integrable and satisfies

$$\int_0^{\pi} \left| \frac{f(x_0 + t) + f(x_0 - t)}2 - \ell \right| \frac{\mathrm{d}t }{t} < \infty,$$

then (S_{n}f)(x_{0}) converges to ℓ. This implies that for any function f of any Hölder class α > 0, the Fourier series converges everywhere to f(x).

It is also known that for any periodic function of bounded variation, the Fourier series converges at every point of continuity. This is the Dirichlet-Jordan theorem. If the function is of bounded variation in a neighborhood of a point then the Fourier series converges there so long as the function is integrable, for example $f(x)=|x|^{-1/2}$ for $|x|$ between 0 and half the period. See also Dini test. In general, the most common criteria for pointwise convergence of a periodic function f are as follows:

- If f satisfies a Holder condition, then its Fourier series converges uniformly.
- If f is of bounded variation, then its Fourier series converges at every point of continuity. If in addition f is continuous, the convergence is uniform.
- If f is continuous and its Fourier coefficients are absolutely summable, then the Fourier series converges uniformly.

There exist continuous functions whose Fourier series converges pointwise but not uniformly.

However, the Fourier series of a continuous function need not converge pointwise. Perhaps the easiest proof uses the non-boundedness of Dirichlet's kernel in L^{1}(T) and the Banach–Steinhaus uniform boundedness principle. As typical for existence arguments invoking the Baire category theorem, this proof is nonconstructive. It shows that the family of continuous functions whose Fourier series converges at a given x is meager (that is, of first Baire category), in the Banach space of continuous functions on the circle.

So in some sense pointwise convergence is atypical, and for most continuous functions the Fourier series does not converge at a given point. However Carleson's theorem shows that for a given continuous function the Fourier series converges almost everywhere.

It is possible to give an explicit example of a continuous function whose Fourier series diverges at 0: for instance, the even and 2π-periodic function f defined for all x in [0,π] by

$$f(x) = \sum_{n=1}^{\infty} \frac{1}{n^2} \sin\left[ \left( 2^{n^3} +1 \right) \frac{x}{2}\right].$$

In this example, it is easy to show how the series behaves at zero. Because the function is even, the Fourier series contains only cosines:

$$f(x) \sim \sum_{m=0}^\infty C_m \cos(mx).$$

The coefficients are:

$$\begin{align}
C_m&=\frac 2\pi\sum_{n=1}^{\infty} \frac{1}{n^2}\int_0^\pi \sin\left[ \left( 2^{n^3} +1 \right) \frac{x}{2}\right]\cos{mx}\,\mathrm{d}x\\
& =\frac 1\pi\sum_{n=1}^{\infty} \frac{1}{n^2}\int_0^\pi \left\{\sin\left[ \left( 2^{n^3} +1-2m\right) \frac{x}{2}\right]+\sin\left[ \left( 2^{n^3} +1+2m\right) \frac{x}{2}\right]\right\}\,\mathrm{d}x\\
& =\frac 1\pi\sum_{n=1}^{\infty} \frac{1}{n^2} \left\{\frac 2{2^{n^3} +1-2m}+\frac 2{2^{n^3} +1+2m}\right\}\\
\end{align}$$

As m increases, the coefficients will be positive and increasing until they reach a value of about $C_m\approx 2/(n^2\pi)$ at $m=2^{n^3}/2$ for some n and then become negative (starting with a value around $-2/(n^2\pi)$) and getting smaller, before starting a new such wave. At $x=0$ the Fourier series is simply the running sum of $C_m,$ and this builds up to around

$$\frac 1{n^2\pi}\sum_{k=0}^{2^{n^3}/2}\frac 2{2k+1}\sim\frac 1{n^2\pi}\ln 2^{n^3}=\frac n\pi\ln 2$$

in the nth wave before returning to around zero, showing that the series does not converge at zero but reaches higher and higher peaks.

== Uniform convergence ==
Suppose $f\in C^p$, and $f^{(p)}$ has modulus of continuity $\omega$; then the partial sums of the Fourier series converge to the function with speed

$$|f(x)-(S_Nf)(x)|\le K {\ln N \over N^p}\omega(2\pi/N)$$

for a constant $K$ that does not depend upon $f$, nor $p$, nor $N$.

This theorem, first proved by D Jackson, says, for example, that if $f$ satisfies the $\alpha$-Hölder condition, then

$$|f(x)-(S_Nf)(x)|\le K {\ln N\over N^\alpha}.$$

If $f$ is $2\pi$ periodic, continuous and of bounded variation, then the Fourier series of $f$ converges uniformly (the Dirichlet-Jordan theorem), but not necessarily absolutely, to $f$.

== Absolute convergence ==
A function ƒ has an absolutely converging Fourier series if

$$\|f\|_A:=\sum_{n=-\infty}^\infty |\widehat{f}(n)|<\infty.$$

If this condition holds then $(S_N f)(x)$ converges absolutely for every $x$. Conversely, for this condition to hold, it suffices that $(S_N f)(x)$ converges absolutely for some $x$. In other words, for absolute convergence there is no issue of where the sum converges absolutely — if it converges absolutely at one point then it does so everywhere.

The family of all functions with absolutely converging Fourier series is a type of Banach algebra called the Wiener algebra, after Norbert Wiener, who proved that if ƒ has absolutely converging Fourier series and is never zero, then 1/ƒ has absolutely converging Fourier series. The original proof of Wiener's theorem was difficult; a simplification using the theory of Banach algebras was given by Israel Gelfand. Finally, a short elementary proof was given by Donald J. Newman in 1975.

Sergei Bernstein's theorem states that, if $f$ belongs to a α-Hölder class for α > 1/2 then

$$\|f\|_A\le c_\alpha \|f\|_{{\rm Lip}_\alpha},\qquad
\|f\|_K:=\sum_{n=-\infty}^{+\infty} |n| |\widehat{f}(n)|^2\le  c_\alpha \|f\|^2_{{\rm Lip}_\alpha}$$

for $\|f\|_{{\rm Lip}_\alpha}$ the constant in the Hölder condition, $c_\alpha$ a constant only dependent on $\alpha$; $\|f\|_K$ is the norm of the Krein algebra. Notice that the 1/2 here is essential—there is an example of a 1/2-Hölder function due to Hardy and Littlewood, which does not belong to the Wiener algebra. Besides, this theorem cannot improve the best known bound on the size of the Fourier coefficient of a α-Hölder function—that is only $O(1/n^\alpha)$ and thus not summable since α is positive.

Zygmund's theorem states that, if ƒ is of bounded variation and belongs to a α-Hölder class for some α > 0, it belongs to the Wiener algebra.

== Norm convergence ==
According to the Riesz–Fischer theorem, if ƒ is square-integrable then $S_N (f)$ converges to ƒ in the L^{2}-norm, that is
$$\lim_{N\rightarrow\infty}\int_0^{2\pi}\left|f(x)-S_N(f) (x)
\right|^2\,\mathrm{d}x=0.$$
The converse is also true: if the limit above is zero, then $f$ must be in $\in L^2$.

The question becomes much harder for $f\in L^p$. It turns out that the convergence still holds if 1 < p < ∞. In other words, for ƒ in L^{p}, $S_N(f)$ converges to ƒ in the L^{p} norm. The original proof uses properties of holomorphic functions and Hardy spaces, and another proof, due to Salomon Bochner relies upon the Riesz–Thorin interpolation theorem. For p = 1 and infinity, the result is not true. The construction of an example of divergence in L^{1} was first done by Andrey Kolmogorov (see below). For infinity, the result is a corollary of the uniform boundedness principle.

If the partial sum S_{N} is replaced by a suitable summability kernel (for example the Fejér sum obtained by convolution with the Fejér kernel), basic functional analytic techniques can be applied to show that norm convergence holds for 1 ≤ p < ∞.

== Convergence almost everywhere ==
The problem of whether the Fourier series of any continuous function converges almost everywhere was posed by Nikolai Lusin in 1913. It was resolved positively in 1966 by Lennart Carleson. His result, now known as Carleson's theorem, says that the Fourier expansion of any function in L^{2} converges almost everywhere. Later Richard Hunt generalized this to L^{p} for any p > 1.

Contrariwise, Andrey Kolmogorov, as a student at the age of 19 in his first scientific work, constructed an example of a function in L^{1} whose Fourier series diverges almost everywhere (later improved to diverge everywhere).

Jean-Pierre Kahane and Yitzhak Katznelson proved that for any given set E of measure zero, there exists a continuous function ƒ such that the Fourier series of ƒ fails to converge on any point of E.

== Summability ==
Does the sequence 0,1,0,1,0,1,... (the partial sums of Grandi's series) converge to 1/2? This does not seem like a very unreasonable generalization of the notion of convergence. Hence we say that any sequence $(a_n)_{n=1}^\infty$ is Cesàro summable to some a if

$$\lim_{n\to\infty}\frac{1}{n}\sum_{k=1}^n s_k=a.$$

Where with $s_k$ we denote the kth partial sum:

$$s_k = a_1 + \cdots + a_k= \sum_{n=1}^k a_n$$

It is not difficult to see that if a sequence converges to some a then it is also Cesàro summable to it.

To discuss summability of Fourier series, we must replace $S_N$ with an appropriate notion. Hence we define

$$K_N(f;t)=\frac{1}{N}\sum_{n=0}^{N-1} S_n(f;t), \quad N \ge 1,$$

and ask: does $K_N(f)$ converge to f? $K_N$ is no longer associated with Dirichlet's kernel, but with Fejér's kernel, namely

$$K_N(f)=f*F_N\,$$

where $F_N$ is Fejér's kernel,

$$F_N=\frac{1}{N}\sum_{n=0}^{N-1} D_n.$$

The main difference is that Fejér's kernel is a positive kernel. Fejér's theorem states that the above sequence of partial sums converge uniformly to ƒ. This implies much better convergence properties

- If ƒ is continuous at t then the Fourier series of ƒ is summable at t to ƒ(t). If ƒ is continuous, its Fourier series is uniformly summable (i.e. $K_N(f)$ converges uniformly to ƒ).
- For any integrable ƒ, $K_N(f)$ converges to ƒ in the $L^1$ norm.
- There is no Gibbs phenomenon.

Results about summability can also imply results about regular convergence. For example, we learn that if ƒ is continuous at t, then the Fourier series of ƒ cannot converge to a value different from ƒ(t). It may either converge to ƒ(t) or diverge. This is because, if $S_N(f;t)$ converges to some value x, it is also summable to it, so from the first summability property above, x = ƒ(t).

== Order of growth ==
The order of growth of Dirichlet's kernel is logarithmic, i.e.

$$\int |D_N(t)|\,\mathrm{d}t = \frac{4}{\pi^2}\log N+O(1).$$

See Big O notation for the notation O(1). The actual value $4/\pi^2$ is both difficult to calculate (see Zygmund 8.3) and of almost no use. The fact that for some constant c we have

$$\int |D_N(t)|\,\mathrm{d}t > c\log N+O(1)$$

is quite clear when one examines the graph of Dirichlet's kernel. The integral over the n-th peak is bigger than c/n and therefore the estimate for the harmonic sum gives the logarithmic estimate.

This estimate entails quantitative versions of some of the previous results. For any continuous function f and any t one has

$$\lim_{N\to\infty} \frac{S_N(f;t)}{\log N}=0.$$

However, for any order of growth ω(n) smaller than log, this no longer holds and it is possible to find a continuous function f such that for some t,

$$\varlimsup_{N\to\infty} \frac{S_N(f;t)}{\omega(N)}=\infty.$$

The equivalent problem for divergence everywhere is open. Sergei Konyagin managed to construct an integrable function such that for every t one has

$$\varlimsup_{N\to\infty} \frac{S_N(f;t)}{\psi(N)}=\infty,$$

where $\psi(N) = o\left(\sqrt{\log N/\log\log N}\right)$ as $N \to \infty$.

It is not known whether this example is best possible. The only bound from the other direction known is log n.

== Multiple dimensions ==
Upon examining the equivalent problem in more than one dimension, it is necessary to specify the precise domain of summation one uses. For example, in two dimensions, one may define

$$S_N(f;t_1,t_2)=\sum_{|n_1|\leq N,|n_2|\leq N}\widehat{f}(n_1,n_2)e^{i(n_1 t_1+n_2 t_2)}$$

which are known as "square partial sums". Replacing the sum above with

$$\sum_{n_1^2+n_2^2\leq N^2}$$

leads to "circular partial sums". The difference between these two definitions is quite notable. For example, the norm of the corresponding Dirichlet kernel for square partial sums is of the order of $\log^2 N$ while for circular partial sums it is of the order of $\sqrt{N}$.

Many of the results true for one dimension are wrong or unknown in multiple dimensions. In particular, the equivalent of Carleson's theorem is still open for circular partial sums. Almost everywhere convergence of "square partial sums" (as well as more general polygonal partial sums) in multiple dimensions was established around 1970 by Charles Fefferman.
