= Dirichlet's theorem =

Dirichlet's theorem may refer to any of several mathematical theorems due to Peter Gustav Lejeune Dirichlet.

- Dirichlet's theorem on arithmetic progressions
- Dirichlet's approximation theorem
- Dirichlet's unit theorem
- Dirichlet conditions
- Dirichlet boundary condition
- Dirichlet's principle
- Pigeonhole principle, sometimes also called Dirichlet's principle
- Dirichlet's test for convergence
