= Richard Allen Hunt =

American mathematician

Richard Allen Hunt (16 June 1937 – 22 March 2009) was an American mathematician. He graduated from Washington University in St. Louis in 1965 with a dissertation entitled Operators acting on Lorentz Spaces. An important result of Hunt (1968) states that the Fourier expansion of a function in L^{p}, p > 1, converges almost everywhere. The case p=2 is due to Lennart Carleson, and for this reason the general result is called the Carleson-Hunt theorem. Hunt was the 1969 recipient of the Salem Prize. He was a faculty member at Purdue University from 1969 to 2000, when he retired as professor emeritus.

== See also ==
- Convergence of Fourier series
