= SFT =

SFT is an initialism that could refer to:

== Science and technology ==
- Schema therapy
- Solitary fibrous tumor, a rare mesenchymal tumor
- Sparse Fourier transform
- Statistical field theory
- String field theory
- Structural family therapy, a type of psychotherapy

== Organizations ==
- Scottish Futures Trust
- Search For Technosignature
- Statens forurensningstilsyn or Norwegian Climate and Pollution Agency
- Striving For Togetherness Records
- Students for a Free Tibet

== Other uses ==
- Sabrina Frederick-Traub (born 1996), Australian rules footballer nicknamed SFT
- Skellefteå Airport (IATA: SFT), Sweden

== See also ==
- Secure file transfer protocol (disambiguation)
