= Summability kernel =

Family of functions

In mathematics, a summability kernel is a family or sequence of periodic integrable functions satisfying a certain set of properties, listed below. Certain kernels, such as the Fejér kernel, are particularly useful in Fourier analysis. Summability kernels are related to approximation of the identity; definitions of an approximation of identity vary, but sometimes the definition of an approximation of the identity is taken to be the same as for a summability kernel.

== Definition ==
Let $\mathbb{T}:=\mathbb{R}/\mathbb{Z}$. A summability kernel is a sequence $(k_n)$ in $L^1(\mathbb{T})$ that satisfies

1. $\int_\mathbb{T}k_n(t)\,dt=1$
2. $\int_\mathbb{T}|k_n(t)|\,dt\le M$ (uniformly bounded)
3. $\int_{\delta\le|t|\le\frac{1}{2}}|k_n(t)|\,dt\to0$ as $n\to\infty$, for every $\delta>0$.

Note that if $k_n\ge0$ for all $n$, i.e. $(k_n)$ is a positive summability kernel, then the second requirement follows automatically from the first.

With the more usual convention $\mathbb{T}=\mathbb{R}/2\pi\mathbb{Z}$, the first equation becomes $\frac{1}{2\pi}\int_\mathbb{T}k_n(t)\,dt=1$, and the upper limit of integration on the third equation should be extended to $\pi$, so that the condition 3 above should be

$\int_{\delta\le|t|\le\pi}|k_n(t)|\,dt\to0$ as $n\to\infty$, for every $\delta>0$.

This expresses the fact that the mass concentrates around the origin as $n$ increases.

One can also consider $\mathbb{R}$ rather than $\mathbb{T}$; then (1) and (2) are integrated over $\mathbb{R}$, and (3) over $|t|>\delta$.

== Examples ==
- The Fejér kernel
- The Poisson kernel (continuous index)
- The Landau kernel
- The Dirichlet kernel is not a summability kernel, since it fails the second requirement.

== Convolutions ==
Let $(k_n)$ be a summability kernel, and $*$ denote the convolution operation.

- If $(k_n),f\in\mathcal{C}(\mathbb{T})$ (continuous functions on $\mathbb{T}$), then $k_n*f\to f$ in $\mathcal{C}(\mathbb{T})$, i.e. uniformly, as $n\to\infty$. In the case of the Fejér kernel this is known as Fejér's theorem.
- If $(k_n),f\in L^1(\mathbb{T})$, then $k_n*f\to f$ in $L^1(\mathbb{T})$, as $n\to\infty$.
- If $(k_n)$ is radially decreasing symmetric and $f\in L^1(\mathbb{T})$, then $k_n*f\to f$ pointwise a.e., as $n\to\infty$. This uses the Hardy–Littlewood maximal function. If $(k_n)$ is not radially decreasing symmetric, but the decreasing symmetrization $\widetilde{k}_n(x):=\sup_{|y|\ge|x|}k_n(y)$ satisfies $\sup_{n\in\mathbb{N}}\|\widetilde{k}_n\|_1<\infty$, then a.e. convergence still holds, using a similar argument.
