= Poisson kernel =

Mathematical concept

In mathematics, and specifically in potential theory, the Poisson kernel is an integral kernel, used for solving the two-dimensional Laplace equation, given Dirichlet boundary conditions on the unit disk. The kernel can be understood as the derivative of the Green's function for the Laplace equation. It is named for Siméon Poisson.

Poisson kernels commonly find applications in control theory and two-dimensional problems in electrostatics. In practice, the definition of Poisson kernels are often extended to n-dimensional problems.

== Two-dimensional Poisson kernels ==
=== On the unit disc ===
In the complex plane, the Poisson kernel for the unit disc is given by $P_r(\theta) = \sum_{n=-\infty}^\infty r^{|n|}e^{in\theta} = \frac{1-r^2}{1-2r\cos\theta +r^2} = \operatorname{Re}\left(\frac{1+re^{i\theta}}{1-re^{i\theta}}\right), \ \ \ 0 \le r < 1.$

This can be thought of in two ways: either as a function of r and θ, or as a family of functions of θ indexed by r.

If $D = \{z:|z|<1\}$ is the open unit disc in C, T is the boundary of the disc, and f a function on T that lies in L^{1}(T), then the function u given by $u(re^{i\theta}) = \frac{1}{2\pi}\int_{-\pi}^\pi P_r(\theta-t)f(e^{it}) \, \mathrm{d}t, \quad 0 \le r < 1$ is harmonic in D and has a radial limit that agrees with f almost everywhere on the boundary T of the disc.

That the boundary value of u is f can be argued using the fact that as r → 1, the functions P_{r}(θ) form an approximate unit in the convolution algebra L^{1}(T). As linear operators, they tend to the Dirac delta function pointwise on L^{p}(T). By the maximum principle, u is the only such harmonic function on D.

Convolutions with this approximate unit gives an example of a summability kernel for the Fourier series of a function in L^{1}(T) (Katznelson 1976). Let f ∈ L^{1}(T) have Fourier series {f_{k}}. After the Fourier transform, convolution with P_{r}(θ) becomes multiplication by the sequence {r^{|k|}} ∈ ℓ^{1}(Z). Taking the inverse Fourier transform of the resulting product {r^{|k|}f_{k}} gives the Abel means A_{r}f of f: $A_r f(e^{2 \pi i x}) = \sum _{k \in \Z} f_k r^{|k|} e^{2 \pi i k x}.$

Rearranging this absolutely convergent series shows that f is the boundary value of g + h, where g (resp. h) is a holomorphic (resp. antiholomorphic) function on D.

When one also asks for the harmonic extension to be holomorphic, then the solutions are elements of a Hardy space. This is true when the negative Fourier coefficients of f all vanish. In particular, the Poisson kernel is commonly used to demonstrate the equivalence of the Hardy spaces on the unit disk, and the unit circle.

The space of functions that are the limits on T of functions in H^{p}(z) may be called H^{p}(T). It is a closed subspace of L^{p}(T) (at least for p ≥ 1). Since L^{p}(T) is a Banach space (for 1 ≤ p ≤ ∞), so is H^{p}(T).

=== On the upper half-plane ===
The unit disk may be conformally mapped to the upper half-plane by means of certain Möbius transformations. Since the conformal map of a harmonic function is also harmonic, the Poisson kernel carries over to the upper half-plane. In this case, the Poisson integral equation takes the form $u(x+iy)=\int_{-\infty}^\infty P_y(x-t)f(t) \, dt, \qquad y > 0.$

The kernel itself is given by $P_y(x)=\frac{1}{\pi}\frac {y}{x^2 + y^2}.$

Given a function $f \in L^p(\R)$, the L^{p} space of integrable functions on the real line, u can be understood as a harmonic extension of f into the upper half-plane. In analogy to the situation for the disk, when u is holomorphic in the upper half-plane, then u is an element of the Hardy space, $H^p,$ and in particular, $\|u\|_{H^p}=\|f\|_{L^p}$

Thus, again, the Hardy space H^{p} on the upper half-plane is a Banach space, and, in particular, its restriction to the real axis is a closed subspace of $L^p(\R).$ The situation is only analogous to the case for the unit disk; the Lebesgue measure for the unit circle is finite, whereas that for the real line is not.

== On the ball ==
For the ball of radius $r, B_r \subset \R^n,$ the Poisson kernel takes the form $P(x,\zeta) = \frac{r^2-|x|^2}{r\omega _{n-1}|x-\zeta|^n}$ where $x\in B_r, \zeta\in S$ (the surface of $B_{r}$), and $\omega _{n-1}$ is the surface area of the unit (n − 1)-sphere.

Then, if u(x) is a continuous function defined on S, the corresponding Poisson integral is the function P[u](x) defined by $P[u](x) = \int_S u(\zeta)P(x,\zeta) \, d\sigma(\zeta).$

It can be shown that P[u](x) is harmonic on the ball $B_{r}$ and that P[u](x) extends to a continuous function on the closed ball of radius r, and the boundary function coincides with the original function u.

== On the upper half-space ==
An expression for the Poisson kernel of an upper half-space can also be obtained. Denote the standard Cartesian coordinates of $\R^{n+1}$ by $(t,x) = (t,x_1,\dots,x_n).$ The upper half-space is the set defined by $H^{n+1} = \left\{ (t;x) \in \R^{n+1} \mid t>0 \right\}.$ The Poisson kernel for H^{n+1} is given by $P(t,x) = c_n\frac{t}{\left(t^2 + \left\|x\right\|^2\right)^{(n+1)/2}}$ where $c_n = \frac{\Gamma[(n+1)/2]}{\pi^{(n+1)/2}}.$

The Poisson kernel for the upper half-space appears naturally as the Fourier transform of the Abel transform in which t assumes the role of an auxiliary parameter. To wit, $P(t,x) = \mathcal{F}(K(t,\cdot))(x) = \int_{\R^n} e^{-2\pi t|\xi|} e^{-2\pi i \xi\cdot x}\,d\xi.$ In particular, it is clear from the properties of the Fourier transform that, at least formally, the convolution $P[u](t,x) = [P(t,\cdot)*u](x)$ is a solution of Laplace's equation in the upper half-plane. One can also show that as t → 0, P[u](t,x) → u(x) in a suitable sense.

== See also ==
- Schwarz integral formula
