= Carleson's theorem =

1966 result in mathematical analysis

Carleson's theorem is a fundamental result in mathematical analysis establishing the (Lebesgue) pointwise almost everywhere convergence of Fourier series of L^{2} functions, proved by Lennart Carleson. The name is also often used to refer to the extension of the result by Richard Hunt to L^{p} functions for p ∈ (1, ∞] (also known as the Carleson–Hunt theorem) and the analogous results for pointwise almost everywhere convergence of Fourier integrals, which can be shown to be equivalent by transference methods.

== Statement of the theorem ==
The result, as extended by Hunt, can be formally stated as follows:

Let f be an L^{p} periodic function for some p ∈ (1, ∞], with Fourier coefficients $\hat{f}(n)$. Then
$$\lim_{N \to \infty} \sum_{|n| \leq N} \hat{f}(n) e^{inx} = f(x)$$
for almost every x.

The analogous result for Fourier integrals is:

Let f ∈ L^{p}(R) for some p ∈ (1, 2] have Fourier transform $\hat{f}(\xi)$. Then
$$\lim_{R \to \infty} \int_{|\xi| \leq R} \hat{f}(\xi) e^{2 \pi i x \xi} \, d\xi = f(x)$$
for almost every x ∈ R.

== History ==
A fundamental question about Fourier series, asked by Fourier himself at the beginning of the 19th century, is whether the Fourier series of a continuous function converges pointwise to the function.

By strengthening the continuity assumption slightly one can easily show that the Fourier series converges everywhere. For example, if a function has bounded variation then its Fourier series converges everywhere to the local average of the function. In particular, if a function is continuously differentiable then its Fourier series converges to it everywhere. This was proven by Dirichlet, who expressed his belief that he would soon be able to extend his result to cover all continuous functions. Another way to obtain convergence everywhere is to change the summation method. For example, Fejér's theorem shows that if one replaces ordinary summation by Cesàro summation then the Fourier series of any continuous function converges uniformly to the function. Further, it is easy to show that the Fourier series of any L^{2} function converges to it in L^{2} norm.

After Dirichlet's result, several experts, including Dirichlet, Riemann, Weierstrass and Dedekind, stated their belief that the Fourier series of any continuous function would converge everywhere. This was disproved by Paul du Bois-Reymond, who showed in 1876 that there is a continuous function whose Fourier series diverges at one point.

The almost-everywhere convergence of Fourier series for L^{2} functions was postulated by N. N. Luzin, and the problem was known as Luzin's conjecture up until its proof by Carleson. Kolmogorov (1923) showed that the analogue of Luzin's conjecture for L^{1} is false by finding such a function whose Fourier series diverges almost everywhere (improved slightly in 1926 to diverging everywhere). Before Carleson's result, the best known estimate for the partial sums s_{n} of the Fourier series of a function in L^{p} was
$$s_n(x) = o(\log (n)^{1/p})\text{ almost everywhere}.$$
In other words, the function s_{n}(x) can still grow to infinity at any given point x as one takes more and more terms of the Fourier series into account, though the growth must be quite slow (slower than the logarithm of n to a small power). This result was proved by Kolmogorov–Seliverstov–Plessner for p = 2, by G. H. Hardy for p = 1, and by Littlewood–Paley for p > 1. This result had not been improved for several decades, leading some experts to suspect that it was the best possible and that Luzin's conjecture was false. Kolmogorov's counterexample in L^{1} was unbounded in any interval, but it was thought to be only a matter of time before a continuous counterexample was found. Carleson said in a 2007 interview that he started by trying to find a continuous counterexample and at one point thought he had a method that would construct one, but realized eventually that his approach could not work. He then tried instead to prove Luzin's conjecture since the failure of his counterexample convinced him that it was probably true.

Carleson's original proof is exceptionally hard to read, and although several authors have simplified the argument there are still no easy proofs of his theorem. Expositions of the original paper include Kahane (1995), Mozzochi (1971), Jørsboe & Mejlbro (1982), and Arias de Reyna (2002). Charles Fefferman published a new proof of Hunt's extension which proceeded by bounding a maximal operator. This, in turn, inspired a much simplified proof of the L^{2} result by Michael Lacey and Christoph Thiele (2000), explained in more detail in Lacey (2004). The books Fremlin (2003) and Grafakos (2014) also give proofs of Carleson's theorem. The theorem was formalized in Lean 4 in 2025.

Katznelson (1966) showed that for any set of measure zero there is a continuous periodic function whose Fourier series diverges at all points of the set (and possibly elsewhere). When combined with Carleson's theorem this shows that there is a continuous function whose Fourier series diverges at all points of a given set of reals if and only if the set has measure zero.

The extension of Carleson's theorem to L^{p} for p > 1 was stated to be a "rather obvious" extension of the case p = 2 in Carleson's paper, and was proved by Hunt. Carleson's result was improved further by Sjölin (1971) to the space L log_{+}(L)log_{+}log_{+}(L) and by Antonov (1996) to the space L log_{+}(L)log_{+}log_{+}log_{+}(L). (Here log_{+}(L) is log(L) if L > 1 and 0 otherwise, and if φ is a function then φ(L) stands for the space of functions f such that φ(|f(x)|) is integrable.)

Konyagin (2000) improved Kolmogorov's counterexample by finding functions with everywhere-divergent Fourier series in a space slightly larger than L log_{+}(L)^{1/2}. One can ask if there is in some sense a largest natural space of functions whose Fourier series converge almost everywhere. The simplest candidate for such a space that is consistent with the results of Antonov and Konyagin is L log_{+}(L).

The extension of Carleson's theorem to Fourier series and integrals in several variables is made more complicated as there are many different ways in which one can sum the coefficients; for example, one can sum over increasing balls, or increasing rectangles. Convergence of rectangular partial sums (and indeed general polygonal partial sums) follows from the one-dimensional case, but the spherical summation problem is still open for L^{2}.

== The Carleson operator ==
The Carleson operator C is the non-linear operator defined by
$$Cf(x) = \sup_N\left|\int_{-N}^N \hat f(y)e^{2\pi i xy} \, dy\right|$$

It is relatively easy to show that the Carleson–Hunt theorem follows from the boundedness of the Carleson operator from L^{p}(R) to itself for 1 < p < ∞. However, proving that it is bounded is difficult, and this was actually what Carleson proved.

== See also ==
- Convergence of Fourier series
