= Schwarz integral formula =

In complex analysis, a branch of mathematics, the Schwarz integral formula, named after Hermann Schwarz, allows one to recover a holomorphic function, up to an imaginary constant, from the boundary values of its real part.

== Unit disc ==
Let f be a function holomorphic on the closed unit disc {z ∈ C | |z| ≤ 1}. Then

$$f(z) = \frac{1}{2\pi i} \oint_{|\zeta| = 1} \frac{\zeta + z}{\zeta - z} \operatorname{Re}(f(\zeta)) \, \frac{d\zeta}{\zeta}+ i\operatorname{Im}(f(0))$$

for all |z| < 1.

== Upper half-plane ==
Let f be a function holomorphic on the closed upper half-plane {z ∈ C | Im(z) ≥ 0} such that, for some α > 0, |z^{α} f(z)| is bounded on the closed upper half-plane. Then

$$f(z) = \frac{1}{\pi i} \int_{-\infty}^\infty \frac{u(\zeta,0)}{\zeta - z} \, d\zeta = \frac{1}{\pi i} \int_{-\infty}^\infty \frac{\operatorname{Re}(f)(\zeta)}{\zeta - z} \, d\zeta$$

for all Im(z) > 0.

Note that, as compared to the version on the unit disc, this formula does not have an arbitrary constant added to the integral; this is because the additional decay condition makes the conditions for this formula more stringent.

== Corollary of Poisson integral formula ==
The formula follows from Poisson integral formula applied to u:

$$u(z) = \frac{1}{2\pi}\int_0^{2\pi} u(e^{i\psi}) \operatorname{Re} {e^{i\psi} + z \over e^{i\psi} - z} \, d\psi, \quad |z| < 1.$$

By means of conformal maps, the formula can be generalized to any simply connected open set.

== Notes and references ==
- Ahlfors, Lars V. (1979), Complex Analysis, Third Edition, McGraw-Hill, ISBN 0-07-085008-9
- Remmert, Reinhold (1990), Theory of Complex Functions, Second Edition, Springer, ISBN 0-387-97195-5
- Saff, E. B., and A. D. Snider (1993), Fundamentals of Complex Analysis for Mathematics, Science, and Engineering, Second Edition, Prentice Hall, ISBN 0-13-327461-6
