= Approximation to the identity =

In mathematics, an approximation to the identity refers to a sequence or net that converges to the identity in some algebra. Specifically, it can mean:

- Nascent delta function, most commonly
- Mollifier, more narrowly
- Approximate identity, more abstractly
