= Half-range Fourier series =

Fourier series defined on an interval [0,L]

In mathematics, a half-range Fourier series is a Fourier series defined on an interval $[0,L]$ instead of the more common $[-L,L]$, with the implication that the analyzed function $f(x), x\in[0,L]$ should be extended to $[-L,0]$ as either an even ($f(-x)=f(x)$) or odd function ($f(-x)=-f(x)$). This allows the expansion of the function in a series solely of sines (odd) or cosines (even). The choice between odd and even is typically motivated by boundary conditions associated with a differential equation satisfied by $f(x)$.

== Definition and motivation ==
Given a function $f(x)$ defined over the interval $[0, L]$, the half-range Fourier series extends $f$ to $[-L,L]$ with either an even or an odd extension. An even extension satisfies the identity

$$f(-x)=f(x)\quad \text{for}\quad x\in[0,L].$$

And an odd extension satisfies the identity

$$f(-x)=-f(x)\quad\text{for}\quad x\in[0,L].$$

An even extension relies on the cosine function since the cosine function is even, and an odd extension uses the sine function since the sine function is odd. The decision between even and odd extensions is usually motivated by the boundary conditions of the problem, especially with partial differential equations such as heat and wave equations.

== Formulation ==
Let $f(x)$ be defined and piecewise continuous on the interval $[0,L]$. The half-range Fourier series for sine and cosine are given as follows:

$$\text{Sine series: }f(x)\sim\sum_{n=1}^{\infty}b_n\sin\left(\frac{n\pi x}{L}\right).$$

And the coefficients $b_n$ are given by

$$b_n=\frac{2}{L}\int_0^L f(x)\sin\left(\frac{n\pi x}{L}\right) \, dx.$$

The cosine series is given as

$$\text{Cosine series: }f(x)\sim\frac{a_0}{2} + \sum_{n=1}^\infty a_n\cos\left(\frac{n\pi x}{L}\right).$$

And the coefficients $a_n$ are given by

$$a_0=\frac{2}{L}\int_0^L f(x) \, dx, \quad a_n=\frac{2}{L} \int_0^L f(x) \cos\left(\frac{n\pi x}{L}\right) \, dx.$$

== Applications ==
Half-range Fourier series are used in solving certain boundary value problems involving heat conduction, vibration, and other physical phenomena modeled by partial differential equations. The advantage in a half-range Fourier series is that the function analyzed need only be defined over $[0,L]$, meaning functions only defined over positive numbers can be analyzed with a half-range Fourier series. Another advantage is using only sines or only cosines. For example, if $f(0)=0$, it can be more practical to use a sine series rather than a full Fourier series. If $f'(0)=0$, it can be more practical to use a cosine series instead.

Example 1.

A partial sum of the derived half-range Fourier sine series for cosine as compared to the graph of cosine. $\text{Orange}=\sum_{k=1}^{n}\frac{8k}{\pi(4k^2-1)}\sin(2kx), \quad \text{Blue}=\cos(x)$ As demonstrated, the Fourier series converges over the interval $[0,\pi]$.

The half-range Fourier sine series expansion for $f(x)=\cos(x)$ with $x\in(0,\pi)$ is computed as follows. Because we want a sine series, it will take the form

$$f(x)\sim\sum_{n=1}^{\infty}b_n\sin(nx)$$

with coefficients given by

$$b_n=\frac{2}{\pi}\int_0^\pi f(x)\sin(nx)\,dx.$$

Noting that because $\pi=L$, these terms cancel out giving only $\sin(nx)$. We substitute the definition of $f(x)$ and obtain

$$b_n=\frac{2}{\pi}\int_0^\pi \cos(x)\sin(nx)\, dx.$$

Using the product-to-sum identity given by $\sin(A)\cos(B)=\frac{\sin(A+B)+\sin(A-B)}{2}$, we convert the integrand into

$$\begin{align}
b_n= {} & \frac{2}{\pi} \int_0^\pi \frac{\sin((n+1)x)+\sin((n-1)x)}{2}\,dx \\[6pt]
= {} & \frac{2}{\pi}\cdot \frac{1}{2} \int_0^\pi \Big[\sin((n+1)x)+\sin((n-1)x)\Big].
\end{align}$$

Applying the fact that for $m\neq 0$, $\int_0^\pi \sin(mx)\,dx=\frac{1-\cos(m\pi)}{m}$, and that $\cos(m\pi)=(-1)^m$, we have

$$\int_0^\pi \sin(mx)\,dx=\frac{1-(-1)^m}{2}.$$

Applying to both terms of the integrand we have

$$b_n=\frac{1}{\pi}\left[\frac{1-(-1)^{n+1}}{n+1}+\frac{1-(-1)^{n-1}}{n-1}\right], \quad n\neq 1.$$

If $n$ is odd, then both $n+1$ and $n-1$ are even, meaning $(-1)^{n+1}=(-1)^{n-1}=1$, and thus the denominators are equal to $0$. Thus, we have

$$b_n=0\text{ when }n\text{ is odd}.$$

We apply this to the special case of $b_1$ as well. Then, if $n$ is even, then $n=2k$, and thus $n-1$ and $n+1$ are odd, meaning $(-1)^{n-1}=(-1)^{n+1}=-1$. Thus, both denominators become $2$, and we obtain

$$b_{2k}=\frac{1}{\pi}\left[\frac{2}{2k+1}+\frac{2}{2k-1}\right]=\frac{2}{\pi}\left[\frac{1}{2k+1}+\frac{1}{2k-1}\right].$$

Combining into a single fraction, we have

$$\frac{1}{2k+1}+\frac{1}{2k-1}=\frac{2k+1+2k-1}{(2k+1)(2k-1)}=\frac{4k}{4k^2-1}.$$

Therefore:

$$b_{2k}=\frac{8k}{\pi(4k^2-1)}.$$

Because $b_n=0$ when $n$ is odd, we can substitute $k$ directly to get the full summation:

$$\cos(x)=\sum_{k=1}^{\infty}\frac{8k}{\pi(4k^2-1)}\sin(2kx), \quad x\in(0,\pi).$$
