= Secure FTP (software) =

FTP client software

- Secure FTP 2.6
- Developer: Glub Tech
- Stable release: 2.6.2 / July 27, 2013; 12 years ago
- Operating system: Cross-platform
- Type: FTP client
- License: Apache v2
- Website: github.com/glub/secureftp
- Repository: github.com/glub/secureftp

Secure FTP is a Java-based FTP client developed by Glub Tech. Some of its features include: FTPS (FTP over SSL/TLS), bookmarks, compression, proxy and firewall support, multiple connections, chmod, drag-and-drop, command-line scripting, and localization for 8 languages, including English, French, German, Spanish, Japanese, Portuguese, Brazilian Portuguese and Russian. It can be used via its GUI or CLI.

== History ==
In 1999, Secure FTP started as a senior project at UCSD by classmates Gary Cohen and Brian Knight. The intent of the project was to address the inherent security flaws in FTP. Up to this point, there were no easy solutions to secure a user's credentials during login to an FTP server. The outcome of this project led to the first known implementation of FTPS (FTP over SSL/TLS).

On July 26, 2013, the project was open-sourced and moved permanently to GitHub.

== Licensing ==
Secure FTP is free for all use under an Apache 2 license.
