= Fejér's theorem =

Mathematical theorem about the Fourier series

In mathematics, Fejér's theorem, named after Hungarian mathematician Lipót Fejér, states the following:

Fejér's Theorem—Let $f: \mathbb{R} \to \mathbb{C}$ be a continuous function with period $2\pi$, let $s_n(f)$ be the $n$th partial sum of the Fourier series of $f$, and let $\sigma_n(f)$ be the sequence of Cesàro means of the sequence $s_n(f)$, that is the sequence of arithmetic means of $s_0(f), \ldots, s_n(f)$. Then the sequence $\sigma_n(f)$ converges uniformly to $f$ on $\mathbb{R}$ as n tends to infinity.

== Explanation of Fejér's Theorem's ==
Explicitly, we can write the Fourier series of $f$ as

$$f(x)= \sum_{n=- \infty}^{\infty} c_n \, e^{inx}$$

where the $n$th partial sum of the Fourier series of $f$ may be written as

$$s_n(f,x)=\sum_{k=-n}^nc_ke^{ikx},$$

where the Fourier coefficients $c_k$ are

$$c_k=\frac{1}{2\pi}\int_{-\pi}^\pi f(t)e^{-ikt}dt.$$

Then, we can define

$$\sigma_n(f,x)=\frac{1}{n}\sum_{k=0}^{n-1}s_k(f,x) = \frac{1}{2\pi}\int_{-\pi}^\pi f(x-t)F_n(t)dt$$

with $F_n$ being the $n$th order Fejér kernel. Then, Fejér's theorem asserts that

$$\lim_{n\to \infty} \sigma_n (f, x) = f(x)$$

with uniform convergence. With the convergence written out explicitly, the above statement becomes

$$\forall \epsilon > 0 \, \exist\, n_0 \in \mathbb{N}:  n \geq n_0 \implies | f(x) - \sigma_n(f,x)| < \epsilon, \, \forall x \in  \mathbb{R}$$

== Proof of Fejér's Theorem ==
We first prove the following lemma:

Lemma 1—The $n$th partial sum of the Fourier series $s_n(f,x)$ may be written using the Dirichlet Kernel as

$$s_n(f,x) = \frac{1}{2\pi} \int_{-\pi}^\pi f(x-t) \, D_n(t) \, dt$$

Proof: Recall the definition of $D_n(x)$, the Dirichlet Kernel:

$$D_n(x) = \sum_{k=-n}^n e^{ikx}$$.

We substitute the integral form of the Fourier coefficients into the formula for $s_n(f,x)$ above

$$s_n(f,x)=\sum_{k=-n}^n c_ke^{ikx} = \sum_{k=-n}^n [\frac{1}{2\pi}\int_{-\pi}^\pi f(t)e^{-ikt}dt ] e^{ikx} = \frac{1}{2\pi} \int_{-\pi}^\pi f(t) \sum_{k=-n}^n e^{ik(x-t)} \, dt = \frac{1}{2\pi} \int_{-\pi}^\pi f(t) \, D_n(x-t) \, dt.$$

Using a change of variables we get

$$s_n(f,x) = \frac{1}{2\pi} \int_{-\pi}^\pi f(x-t) \, D_n(t) \, dt.$$

This completes the proof of Lemma 1.

We next prove the following lemma:

Lemma 2—The nth Cesaro sum $\sigma_n(f,x)$ may be written using the Fejér Kernel as: $\sigma_n(f,x)=\frac{1}{2\pi}\int_{-\pi}^\pi f(x-t)F_n(t)dt$

Proof: Recall the definition of the Fejér Kernel $F_n(x)$

$$F_n(x)  = \frac{1}{n} \sum_{k=0}^{n-1}D_k(x)$$

As in the case of Lemma 1, we substitute the integral form of the Fourier coefficients into the formula for $\sigma_n(f,x)$

$$\sigma_n(f,x)=\frac{1}{n}\sum_{k=0}^{n-1}s_k(f,x) = \frac{1}{n}\sum_{k=0}^{n-1} \frac{1}{2\pi} \int_{-\pi}^\pi f(x-t) \, D_k(t) \, dt = \frac{1}{2\pi} \int_{-\pi}^\pi  f(x-t) \, [\frac{1}{n}\sum_{k=0}^{n-1} D_k(t)] \, dt = \frac{1}{2\pi} \int_{-\pi}^\pi  f(x-t) \, F_n(t) \, dt$$

This completes the proof of Lemma 2.

We next prove the 3rd Lemma:

Lemma 3—The Fejer Kernel has the following 3 properties:

- a) $\frac{1}{2\pi} \int_{-\pi}^\pi F_n (x) \, dx =1$
- b) $F_n(x) \geq 0$
- c) For all fixed $\delta > 0$, $\lim_{n \to \infty} \int_{\delta \leq |x| \leq \pi} F_n (x) \, dx = 0$

Proof: a) Given that $F_n$ is the mean of $D_n$, the integral of which is 1, by linearity, the integral of $F_n$ is also equal to 1.

b) As $D_n(x)$ is a geometric sum, we get a simple formula for $D_n(x)$ and then for $F_n(x)$, using De Moivre's formula:

$$F_n(x) = \frac{1}{n} \sum_{k=0}^{n-1}\frac{\sin((2k + 1) x / 2)}{\sin(x / 2)} = \frac{1}{n} \frac{\sin^2(n x / 2)}{\sin^2(x / 2)} \geq 0$$

c) For all fixed $\delta > 0$,

$$\int_{\delta \leq |x| \leq \pi} F_n (x) \, dx = \frac{2}{n} \int_{\delta \leq x \leq \pi} \frac{\sin^2(n x / 2)}{\sin^2(x / 2)} \, dx \leq \frac{2}{n} \int_{\delta \leq x \leq \pi} \frac{1}{\sin^2(x / 2)} \, dx$$

This shows that the integral converges to zero, as $n$ goes to infinity. This completes the proof of Lemma 3.

We are now ready to prove Fejér's Theorem. First, let us recall the statement we are trying to prove

$$\forall \epsilon > 0 \, \exist\, n_0 \in \mathbb{N}:  n \geq n_0 \implies | f(x) - \sigma_n(f,x)| < \epsilon, \, \forall x \in  \mathbb{R}$$

We want to find an expression for $|\sigma_n(f,x) - f(x) |$. We begin by invoking Lemma 2:

$$\sigma_n(f,x)= \frac{1}{2\pi} \int_{-\pi}^\pi  f(x-t) \, F_n(t) \, dt.$$

By Lemma 3a we know that

$$\sigma_n(f,x) - f(x) = \frac{1}{2\pi} \int_{-\pi}^\pi  f(x-t) \, F_n(t) \, dt - f(x) = \frac{1}{2\pi} \int_{-\pi}^\pi  f(x-t) \, F_n(t) \, dt - f(x) \frac{1}{2\pi} \int_{-\pi}^\pi F_n(t) \, dt = \frac{1}{2\pi} \int_{-\pi}^\pi  f(x-t) \, F_n(t) \, dt - \frac{1}{2\pi} \int_{-\pi}^\pi f(x) \, F_n(t) \, dt = \frac{1}{2\pi} \int_{-\pi}^\pi  [f(x-t)-f(x)] \, F_n(t) \, dt.$$

Applying the triangle inequality yields

$$|\sigma_n(f,x) - f(x) |= |\frac{1}{2\pi} \int_{-\pi}^\pi  [f(x-t)-f(x)] \, F_n(t) \, dt| \leq \frac{1}{2\pi} \int_{-\pi}^\pi  |[f(x-t)-f(x)] \, F_n(t)| \, dt = \frac{1}{2\pi} \int_{-\pi}^\pi  |f(x-t)-f(x)| \, |F_n(t)| \, dt,$$

and by Lemma 3b, we get

$$|\sigma_n(f,x) - f(x) |=  \frac{1}{2\pi} \int_{-\pi}^\pi  |f(x-t)-f(x)| \, F_n(t) \, dt.$$

We now split the integral into two parts, integrating over the two regions $|t| \leq \delta$ and $\delta \leq |t| \leq \pi$.

$$|\sigma_n(f,x) - f(x) |=  \left( \frac{1}{2\pi} \int_{|t| \leq \delta}  |f(x-t)-f(x)| \, F_n(t) \, dt \right) +  \left( \frac{1}{2\pi} \int_{\delta \leq|t|\leq \pi}  |f(x-t)-f(x)| \, F_n(t) \, dt \right)$$

The motivation for doing so is that we want to prove that $\lim_{n \to \infty} |\sigma_n(f,x) - f(x) |=0$. We can do this by proving that each integral above, integral 1 and integral 2, goes to zero. This is precisely what we will do in the next step.

We first note that the function $f$ is continuous on $[-\pi,\pi]$. We invoke the theorem that every periodic function on $[-\pi,\pi]$ that is continuous is also bounded and uniformily continuous. This means that

$$\forall \epsilon > 0,\exist \delta > 0: |x-y| \leq \delta \implies |f(x)-f(y)| \leq \epsilon$$.

Hence we can rewrite the integral 1 as follows

$$\frac{1}{2\pi} \int_{|t| \leq \delta}  |f(x-t)-f(x)| \, F_n(t) \, dt \leq \frac{1}{2\pi} \int_{|t| \leq \delta}  \epsilon \, F_n(t) \, dt = \frac{1}{2\pi}\epsilon \int_{|t| \leq \delta}  \, F_n(t) \, dt$$

Because $F_n(x) \geq 0, \forall x\in \mathbb{R}$ and $\delta \leq \pi$

$$\frac{1}{2\pi}\epsilon \int_{|t| \leq \delta}  \, F_n(t) \, dt \leq \frac{1}{2\pi}\epsilon \int_{-\pi}^\pi  \, F_n(t) \, dt$$

By Lemma 3a we then get for all n

$$\frac{1}{2\pi}\epsilon \int_{-\pi}^\pi  \, F_n(t) \, dt = \epsilon$$

This gives the desired bound for integral 1 which we can exploit in final step.

For integral 2, we note that since $f$ is bounded, we can write this bound as $M=\sup_{-\pi \leq t \leq \pi} |f(t)|$

$$\frac{1}{2\pi} \int_{\delta \leq|t|\leq \pi}  |f(x-t)-f(x)| \, F_n(t) \, dt \leq \frac{1}{2\pi} \int_{\delta \leq|t|\leq \pi} 2M \, F_n(t) \, dt
= \frac{M}{\pi} \int_{\delta \leq|t|\leq \pi}F_n(t) \, dt$$

We are now ready to prove that $\lim_{n \to \infty} |\sigma_n(f,x) - f(x) |=0$. We begin by writing

$$|\sigma_n(f,x) - f(x) | \leq \epsilon \, + \frac{M}{\pi} \int_{\delta \leq|t|\leq \pi}F_n(t) \, dt$$

Thus,

$$\lim_{n \to \infty} |\sigma_n(f,x) - f(x) |\leq \lim_{n \to \infty} \epsilon \, + \lim_{n \to \infty} \frac{M}{\pi} \int_{\delta \leq|t|\leq \pi}F_n(t) \, dt$$

By Lemma 3c we know that the integral goes to 0 as $n$ goes to infinity, and because epsilon is arbitrary, we can set it equal to 0. Hence $\lim_{n \to \infty} |\sigma_n(f,x) - f(x) |=0$, which completes the proof.

== Modifications and Generalisations of Fejér's Theorem ==
In fact, Fejér's theorem can be modified to hold for pointwise convergence.

Modified Fejér's Theorem—Let $f \in L^2(- \pi, \pi)$ be continuous at $x\in(-\pi,\pi)$, then $\sigma_n(f,x)$ converges pointwise as n goes to infinity.

Sadly however, the theorem does not work in a general sense when we replace the sequence $\sigma_n (f,x)$ with $s_n (f,x)$. This is because there exist functions whose Fourier series fails to converge at some point. However, the set of points at which a function in $L^2(-\pi, \pi)$ diverges has to be measure zero. This fact, called Lusins conjecture or Carleson's theorem, was proved in 1966 by L. Carleson. We can however prove a corollary relating which goes as follows:

Corollary—Let $s_n \in \mathbb{C}, \, \forall n \in \, \mathbb{Z}_+$. If $s_n$ converges to $s$ as $n$ goes to infinity, then $\sigma_n$ converges to $s$ as $n$ goes to infinity.

A more general form of the theorem applies to functions which are not necessarily continuous (Zygmund 1968, Theorem III.3.4). Suppose that $f$ is in $L^1(-\pi,\pi)$. If the left and right limits $f(x_0\pm 0)$ of $f(x)$ exist at $x_0$, or if both limits are infinite of the same sign, then

$$\sigma_n(x_0) \to \frac{1}{2}\left(f(x_0+0)+f(x_0-0)\right).$$

Existence or divergence to infinity of the Cesàro mean is also implied. By a theorem of Marcel Riesz, Fejér's theorem holds precisely as stated if the (C, 1) mean $\sigma_n$ is replaced with (C, α) mean of the Fourier series (Zygmund 1968, Theorem III.5.1).
