= SFTP =

SFTP may refer to:

== Computing ==
- SSH File Transfer Protocol, a network protocol used for secure file transfer over secure shell
  - Secure file transfer program, an SSH File Transfer Protocol client from the OpenSSH project
- Simple File Transfer Protocol, an unsecured file transfer protocol from the early days of the Internet
- Screened fully shielded twisted pair, a kind of network cable

== Other ==
- Science for the People, a U.S. left-wing organization and magazine
- Six Flags Theme Parks, chain of amusement parks and theme parks
- Stray from the Path, an American metalcore band
- Supplemental Federal Test Procedure, EPA fuel economy testing procedures which supplement FTP-75 standard

== See also ==
- FTPS, or FTP over SSL, another name used to encompass a number of ways in which FTP software can perform secure file transfers
