= Dirichlet–Jordan test =

Theorem

In mathematics, the Dirichlet–Jordan test gives sufficient conditions for a complex-valued, periodic function $f$ to be equal to the sum of its Fourier series at a point of continuity. Moreover, the behavior of the Fourier series at points of discontinuity is determined as well (it is the midpoint of the values of the discontinuity). It is one of many conditions for the convergence of Fourier series.

The original test was established by Peter Gustav Lejeune Dirichlet in 1829, for piecewise monotone functions (functions with a finite number of sections per period each of which is monotonic). It was extended in the late 19th century by Camille Jordan to functions of bounded variation in each period (any function of bounded variation is the difference of two monotonically increasing functions).

== Dirichlet–Jordan test for Fourier series ==
Let $f(x)$ be complex-valued integrable function on the interval $[-\pi,\pi]$ and the partial sums of its Fourier series $S_nf(x)$, given by
$$S_nf(x) = \sum_{k=-n}^nc_k e^{ikx},$$
with Fourier coefficients $c_k$ defined as
$$c_k = \frac{1}{2\pi} \int_{-\pi}^\pi f(x) e^{-ikx}\, dx.$$
The Dirichlet-Jordan test states that if $f$ is of bounded variation, then for each $x \in [-\pi,\pi]$ the limit $S_nf(x)$ exists and is equal to
$$\lim_{n \to \infty} S_nf(x) =\lim_{\varepsilon\to 0}\frac{f(x+\varepsilon)+f(x-\varepsilon)}{2}.$$
Alternatively, Jordan's test states that if $f\in L^1$ is of bounded variation in a neighborhood of $x$, then the limit of $S_nf(x)$ exists and converges in a similar manner.

If, in addition, $f$ is continuous at $x$, then
$$\lim_{n \to \infty} S_nf(x) = f(x).$$
Moreover, if $f$ is continuous at every point in $[-\pi,\pi]$, then the convergence is uniform rather than just pointwise.

The analogous statement holds irrespective of the choice of period of $f$, or which version of the Fourier series is chosen.

== Jordan test for Fourier integrals ==
For the Fourier transform on the real line, there is a version of the test as well. Suppose that $f(x)$ is in $L^1(-\infty,\infty)$ and of bounded variation in a neighborhood of the point $x$. Then
$$\frac1\pi\lim_{M\to\infty}\int_0^{M}du\int_{-\infty}^\infty f(t)\cos u(x-t)\,dt = \lim_{\varepsilon\to 0}\frac{f(x+\varepsilon)+f(x-\varepsilon)}{2}.$$
If $f$ is continuous in an open interval, then the integral on the left-hand side converges uniformly in the interval, and the limit on the right-hand side is $f(x)$.

This version of the test (although not satisfying modern demands for rigor) is historically prior to Dirichlet, being due to Joseph Fourier.

== Dirichlet conditions in signal processing ==
In signal processing, the test is often retained in the original form due to Dirichlet: a piecewise monotone bounded periodic function $f$ (having a finite number of monotonic intervals per period) has a convergent Fourier series whose value at each point is the arithmetic mean of the left and right limits of the function. The condition of piecewise monotonicity stipulates having only finitely many local extrema per period, which implies $f$ is of bounded variation (though the reverse is not true). (Dirichlet required in addition that the function have only finitely many discontinuities, but this constraint is unnecessarily stringent.) Any signal that can be physically produced in a laboratory satisfies these conditions.

As in the pointwise case of the Jordan test, the condition of boundedness can be relaxed if the function is assumed to be absolutely integrable (i.e., $L^1$) over a period, provided it satisfies the other conditions of the test in a neighborhood of the point $x$ where the limit is taken.

== See also ==
- Dini test
