= Fejér kernel =

Family of functions in mathematics

Plot of several Fejér kernels

In mathematics, the Fejér kernel is a summability kernel used to express the effect of Cesàro summation on Fourier series. It is a non-negative kernel, giving rise to an approximate identity. It is named after the Hungarian mathematician Lipót Fejér (1880–1959).

== Definition ==
The Fejér kernel has many equivalent definitions. Three such definitions are outlined below:

1) The traditional definition expresses the Fejér kernel $F_n(x)$ in terms of the Dirichlet kernel

$$F_n(x) = \frac{1}{n} \sum_{k=0}^{n-1}D_k(x)$$

where

$$D_k(x)=\sum_{s=-k}^k {\rm e}^{isx}$$

is the $k$th order Dirichlet kernel.

2) The Fejér kernel $F_n(x)$ may also be written in a closed form expression as follows:

$F_n(x) = \frac{1}{n} \left(\frac{\sin( \frac{nx}{2})}{\sin( \frac{x}{2})}\right)^2 = \frac{1}{n} \, \frac{1 - \cos(nx)}{1 - \cos (x)}$

This closed form expression may be derived from Definition 1; a proof of this result goes as follows.

Using the fact that the Dirichlet kernel may be written as:

$$D_k(x)=\frac{
\sin((k+\frac{1}{2})x)}{\sin\frac{x}{2}}$$,

one obtains from the definition of the Fejér kernel above:

$$F_n(x) = \frac{1}{n} \sum_{k=0}^{n-1}D_k(x) = \frac{1}{n} \sum_{k=0}^{n-1} \frac{
\sin((k+\frac{1}{2})x)}{\sin(\frac{x}{2})}
= \frac{1}{n} \frac{1}{\sin(\frac{x}{2})}\sum_{k=0}^{n-1}
\sin((k+\frac{1}{2})x) = \frac{1}{n} \frac{1}{\sin^2(\frac{x}{2})}\sum_{k=0}^{n-1}
\big[\sin((k+\frac{1}{2})x) \cdot \sin(\frac{x}{2})\big]$$

By the trigonometric identity: $\sin(\alpha)\cdot\sin(\beta)=\frac{1}{2}(\cos(\alpha-\beta)-\cos(\alpha+\beta))$, one has

$$F_n(x) =\frac{1}{n} \frac{1}{\sin^2(\frac{x}{2})}\sum_{k=0}^{n-1}
[\sin((k+\frac{1}{2})x) \cdot \sin(\frac{x}{2})] = \frac{1}{n} \frac{1}{2\sin^2(\frac{x}{2})}\sum_{k=0}^{n-1} [\cos(kx)-\cos((k+1)x)],$$

which allows evaluation of $F_n(x)$ as a telescoping sum:

$$F_n(x) = \frac{1}{n} \frac{1}{\sin^2 \left(\frac{x}{2} \right)}\frac{1-\cos(nx)}2=\frac{1}{n} \frac{1}{\sin^2 \left(\frac{x}{2} \right)}\sin^2 \left(\frac{nx}2 \right) =\frac{1}{n} \left( \frac{\sin(\frac{nx}2)}{\sin(\frac{x}{2})} \right)^2.$$

3) The Fejér kernel can also be expressed as:

$$F_n(x)=\sum_{ |k| \leq n-1} \left(1-\frac{ |k| }{n}\right) \mathrm{e}^{ikx}$$

== Properties ==
The Fejér kernel is a positive summability kernel. An important property of the Fejér kernel is $F_n(x) \ge 0$ with average value of $1$.

=== Convolution ===
The convolution $F_n$ is positive: for $f \ge 0$ of period $2 \pi$ it satisfies

$$0 \le (f*F_n)(x)=\frac{1}{2\pi}\int_{-\pi}^\pi f(y) F_n(x-y)\,dy.$$

Since

$$f*D_n=S_n(f)=\sum_{|j|\le n}\widehat{f}_j \mathrm{e}^{ijx} ,$$

we have

$$f*F_n=\frac{1}{n}\sum_{k=0}^{n-1}S_k(f),$$

which is Cesàro summation of Fourier series. By Young's convolution inequality,

$$\|F_n*f \|_{L^p([-\pi, \pi])} \le \|f\|_{L^p([-\pi, \pi])} \text{ for every } 1 \le p \le \infty\ \text{for}\ f\in L^p.$$

Additionally, if $f\in L^1([-\pi,\pi])$, then

$f*F_n \rightarrow f$ a.e.

Since $[-\pi,\pi]$ has finite volume, $L^1([-\pi,\pi])\supset L^2([-\pi,\pi])\supset\cdots\supset L^\infty([-\pi,\pi])$, so the result holds for other $L^p$ spaces, $p\ge1$, as well.

If $f$ is continuous, then the convergence is uniform, yielding a proof of the Weierstrass theorem.

- One consequence of the pointwise a.e. convergence is the uniqueness of Fourier coefficients: If $f,g\in L^1$ with $\hat{f}=\hat{g}$, then $f=g$ a.e. This follows from writing

$$f*F_n=\sum_{|j|\le n}\left(1-\frac{|j|}{n}\right)\hat{f}_j \mathrm{e}^{ijt},$$

which depends only on the Fourier coefficients.

- A second consequence is that if $\lim_{n\to\infty}S_n(f)$ exists a.e., then $\lim_{n\to\infty}F_n(f)=f$ a.e., since the Cesàro means of $F_n*f$ converge to the original sequence limit if it exists.

=== Applications ===
The Fejér kernel is used in signal processing and Fourier analysis.

== See also ==
- Fejér's theorem
- Dirichlet kernel
- Gibbs phenomenon
- Charles Jean de la Vallée-Poussin
