= Dirichlet kernel =

Concept in mathematical analysis

In mathematical analysis, the Dirichlet kernel, is the collection of periodic functions defined as

$$D_n(x)= \sum_{k=-n}^n e^{ikx} = 1+2\sum_{k=1}^n\cos(kx)=\frac{\sin\left(\left(n +1/2\right) x \right)}{\sin(x/2)},$$

where n is any nonnegative integer. The kernel functions are periodic with period $2\pi$.

Plot restricted to one period $[-L,L],~L=\pi,~$ of the first few Dirichlet kernels showing their convergence to one of the Dirac delta distributions of the Dirac comb.

The importance of the Dirichlet kernel comes from its relation to Fourier series. The convolution of $D_n(x)$ with any function $f$ of period $2\pi$ is the $n$th-degree Fourier series approximation to $f$, i.e., we have

$$(D_n*f)(x)=\int_{-\pi}^\pi f(y)D_n(x-y)\,dy=2\pi\sum_{k=-n}^n \hat{f}(k)e^{ikx},$$

where

$$\widehat{f}(k)=\frac 1 {2\pi}\int_{-\pi}^\pi f(y)e^{-iky}\,dy$$

is the $k$th Fourier coefficient of $f$. This implies that in order to study convergence of Fourier series it is enough to study properties of the Dirichlet kernel.

The Dirichlet kernel was named for Peter Gustav Lejeune Dirichlet.

== Applications ==
In signal processing, the Dirichlet kernel is often called the periodic sinc function:

$$P(\omega) =  D_n(x)|_{x = 2 \pi \omega/\omega_0}  = { \sin(\pi M \omega / \omega_0 ) \over \sin(\pi \omega / \omega_0 ) }$$

where $M = 2n + 1 \ge 3$ is an odd integer. In this form, $\omega$ is the angular frequency, and $\omega_0$ is half of the periodicity in frequency. In this case, the periodic sinc function in the frequency domain can be thought of as the Fourier transform of a time bounded impulse train in the time domain:

$$p(t) = \sum_{k=-n}^n \delta(t - kT)$$

where $T = \frac{\pi}{\omega_0}$ is the time increment between each impulse and $M = 2n+1$ represents the number of impulses in the impulse train.

This kernel is also the Fourier Transform of a discrete time moving average filter.

In optics, the Dirichlet kernel is part of the mathematical description of the diffraction pattern formed when monochromatic light passes through an aperture with multiple narrow slits of equal width and equally spaced along an axis perpendicular to the optical axis. In this case, $M$ is the number of slits.

Plot restricted to one period of the first few Dirichlet kernels (multiplied by $2 \pi$).

== L^{1} norm of the kernel function ==
Of particular importance is the fact that the $L^1$ norm of $D_n$ on $[0, 2\pi]$ diverges to infinity as $n\to\infty$. One can estimate that (using the big omega notation)

$$\| D_n \| _{L^1} = \Omega(\log n).$$

By using a Riemann-sum argument to estimate the contribution in the largest neighbourhood of zero in which $D_n$ is positive, and Jensen's inequality for the remaining part, it is also possible to show that:

$$\| D_n \|_{L^1} \geq 4\operatorname{Si}(\pi)+\frac 8 \pi \log n$$

where $\operatorname{Si}(x)$ is the sine integral $\int_0^x (\sin t)/t\, dt.$

This lack of uniform integrability is behind many divergence phenomena for the Fourier series. For example, together with the uniform boundedness principle, it can be used to show that the Fourier series of a continuous function may fail to converge pointwise, in rather dramatic fashion. See convergence of Fourier series for further details.

A precise proof of the first result that $\| D_n \| _{L^1[0,2\pi]} = \Omega(\log n)$ is given by

$$\begin{align}
\int_0^{2\pi} |D_n(x)| \, dx & \geq \int_0^\pi \frac{\left|\sin[(2n+1)x]\right|}{x} \, dx \\[5pt]
& \geq \sum_{k=0}^{2n} \int_{k\pi}^{(k+1)\pi} \frac{\left|\sin s\right|}{s} \, ds \\[5pt]
& \geq \left|\sum_{k=0}^{2n} \int_0^\pi \frac{\sin s}{(k+1)\pi} \, ds\right| \\[5pt]
& = \frac{2}{\pi} H_{2n+1} \\[5pt]
& \geq \frac{2}{\pi} \log(2n+1),
\end{align}$$

where we have used the Taylor series identity that $2/x \leq 1 / \left|\sin(x/2)\right|$ and where $H_n$ are the first-order harmonic numbers.

== Relation to the periodic delta function ==
The Dirichlet kernel is a periodic function which becomes the Dirac comb, i.e. the periodic delta function, in the limit

$$\lim_{n \to \infty} D_n(\omega) = \lim_{n \to \infty} \sum_{k=-n}^{n} e^{\pm i \omega k} = \sum_{k=-\infty}^{\infty} e^{\pm i 2 \pi k x} = \sum_{k=-\infty}^{\infty} \delta(x- k)=2\pi \sum_{k=-\infty}^{\infty} \delta(\omega - 2\pi k)  ~,$$

with the angular frequency $\omega=2 \pi x$.

This can be inferred from the autoconjugation property of the Dirichlet kernel under forward and inverse Fourier transform:

$$\mathcal{F}\left[ D_n(2 \pi x) \right](\xi) = \mathcal{F}^{-1}\left[ D_n(2 \pi x) \right](\xi) =  \int_{-\infty}^{\infty} D_n(2 \pi x) e^{\pm  i 2\pi \xi x} \, dx = \sum_{k=-n}^{+n} \delta(\xi-k) \equiv \operatorname{comb}_n(\xi)$$
$$\mathcal{F}\left[ \operatorname{comb}_n \right](x) = \mathcal{F}^{-1}\left[ \operatorname{comb}_n \right](x) = \int_{-\infty}^\infty \operatorname{comb}_n(\xi) e^{ \pm i 2 \pi \xi x } \, d\xi = D_n(2 \pi x),$$

and $\operatorname{comb}_n(x)$ goes to the Dirac comb $\operatorname{\text{Ш}}$ of period $T=1$ as $n \rightarrow \infty$, which remains invariant under Fourier transform: $\mathcal{F}[\operatorname{\text{Ш}}]= \operatorname{\text{Ш}}$. Thus $D_n(2 \pi x)$ must also have converged to $\operatorname{\text{Ш}}$ as $n \rightarrow \infty$.

In a different vein, consider $\Delta(x)$ as the identity element for convolution on functions of period $2\pi$. In other words, we have

$$f*( \Delta)=f$$

for every function $f$ of period 2π. The Fourier series representation of this "function" is

$$\Delta(x)\sim\sum_{k=-\infty}^\infty e^{ikx}= \left(1 + 2\sum_{k=1}^\infty \cos(kx)\right).$$

(This Fourier series converges to the function almost nowhere.) Therefore, the Dirichlet kernel, which is just the sequence of partial sums of this series, can be thought of as an approximate identity. Abstractly speaking it is not however an approximate identity of positive elements (hence the failures in pointwise convergence mentioned above).

== Proof of the trigonometric identity ==
The trigonometric identity

$$\sum_{k=-n}^n e^{ikx} = \frac{\sin((n+1/2)x)}{\sin(x/2)}$$

displayed at the top of this article may be established as follows. First recall that the sum of a finite geometric series is

$$\sum_{k=0}^n a r^k=a\frac{1-r^{n+1}}{1-r}.$$

In particular, we have

$$\sum_{k=-n}^n r^k=r^{-n}\cdot\frac{1-r^{2n+1}}{1-r}.$$

Multiply both the numerator and the denominator by $r^{-1/2}$, getting

$$\frac{r^{-n-1/2}}{r^{-1/2}}\cdot\frac{1-r^{2n+1}}{1-r} =\frac{r^{-n-1/2}-r^{n+1/2}}{r^{-1/2}-r^{1/2}}.$$

In the case $r = e^{ix}$ we have

$$\sum_{k=-n}^n e^{ikx} = \frac{e^{-(n+1/2)ix}-e^{(n+1/2)ix}}{e^{-ix/2}-e^{ix/2}} = \frac{-2i\sin((n+1/2)x)}{-2i\sin(x/2)} = \frac{\sin((n+1/2)x)}{\sin(x/2)}$$

as required.

=== Alternative proof of the trigonometric identity ===
Start with the series

$$f(x) = 1 + 2 \sum_{k=1}^n\cos(kx).$$

Multiply both sides by $\sin(x/2)$ and use the trigonometric identity

$$\cos(a)\sin(b) = \frac{\sin(a + b) - \sin(a - b)} 2$$

to reduce the terms in the sum.

$$\sin(x/2)f(x) = \sin(x/2)+ \sum_{k=1}^n \left( \sin((k + \tfrac 1 2 )x)- \sin((k-\tfrac 1 2 )x) \right)$$

which telescopes down to the result.

== Variant of identity ==
If the sum is only over non-negative integers (which may arise when computing a discrete Fourier transform that is not centered), then using similar techniques we can show the following identity:

$$\sum_{k=0}^{N-1} e^{ikx} = e^{i(N-1)x/2}\frac{\sin(N \, x/2)}{\sin(x/2)}$$

Another variant is

$$D_n(x) - \cos (nx) = \frac{\sin\left(nx \right)}{\tan(\frac{x}{2})}$$

and this can be easily proved by using an identity $\sin (\alpha + \beta) = \sin (\alpha) \cos (\beta) + \cos (\alpha) \sin(\beta)$.

== See also ==
- Fejér kernel

== Sources ==
- Bruckner, Andrew M.; Bruckner, Judith B.; Thomson, Brian S. (1997). "15 Fourier Series §15.2 Dirichlet's Kernel". Real Analysis. Prentice-Hall. pp. 619–622. ISBN 0-13-458886-X.
- Podkorytov, A.N. (1988). "Asymptotic behavior of the Dirichlet kernel of Fourier sums with respect to a polygon". Journal of Soviet Mathematics. 42 (2): 1640–6. doi:10.1007/BF01665052.
- Levi, H. (1974). "A geometric construction of the Dirichlet kernel". Transactions of the New York Academy of Sciences. 36 (7 Series II): 640–3. doi:10.1111/j.2164-0947.1974.tb03023.x.
- "Dirichlet kernel", Encyclopedia of Mathematics, EMS Press, 2001 [1994]
- Dirichlet kernel at PlanetMath
