= Homogeneity (disambiguation) =

Homogeneity is a sameness of constituent structure.

Homogeneity, homogeneous, or homogenization may also refer to:

== In mathematics ==
- Asymptotic homogenization, a method to study partial differential equations with highly oscillatory coefficients
- Homogeneous coordinates, used in projective spaces
- Homogeneous differential equation
- Homogeneous distribution
- Homogeneous element and homogeneous ideal in a graded ring
- Homogeneous equation (linear algebra): systems of linear equations with zero constant term
- Homogeneous function
- Homogeneous graph
- Homogeneous (large cardinal property)
- Homogeneous linear transformation
- Homogeneous model in model theory
- Homogeneous polynomial
- Homogeneous relation: binary relation on a set
- Homogeneous space for a Lie group G, or more general transformation group
- Homogenization of a polynomial, a mathematical operation
- Transcendental law of homogeneity of Leibniz

=== In statistics ===
- Homogeneity (statistics), logically consistent data matrices
- Homogeneity of variance

== In chemistry ==
- Homogeneous catalysis, a sequence of chemical reactions that involve a catalyst in the same phase as the reactants
- Homogeneous (chemistry), a property of a mixture showing no variation in properties
- Homogenization (chemistry), intensive mixing of mutually insoluble substance or groups of substance to obtain a soluble suspension or constant

== Other uses ==
- Ethnic homogeneity:
  - Monoethnicity, the existence of a single ethnic group in a given region or country
  - Monoculturalism, the policy or process of supporting, advocating, or allowing the expression of the culture of a single social or ethnic group
- Heterogeneity (disambiguation), diverseness of constituent structure (the opposite of homogeneity)
- Homogeneity (physics), translational invariance or compatibility of units in equations
- Homogeneity (semantics), when a predicate must hold of all or none of some plurality
- Homogenization (biology), a process that involves breaking apart cells — releasing organelles and cytoplasm
- Homogenization (climate), the process of removing non-climatic changes from climate data
- Milk#Creaming and homogenization, process to prevent separation of the cream
- Species homogeneity, all of the same or similar kind or nature

== See also ==
- Homozygosity
