= Uniform law =

Uniform law may refer to:

- Uniform distribution (disambiguation), any of several concepts in mathematics
- Uniform Act, a model statute designed to be adopted by many jurisdictions
- A body of harmonised laws, see harmonisation of law
- Dress code
- School uniform rules or regulations
