= Uniform distribution =

Uniform distribution may refer to:

- Continuous uniform distribution
- Discrete uniform distribution
- Uniform distribution (ecology)
- Equidistributed sequence

== See also ==
- Homogeneous distribution
