= Heterogeneity (disambiguation) =

Heterogeneity is a diverseness of constituent structure.

Heterogeneity or heterogeneous may also refer to:

== Data analysis ==
- Heterogeneity in statistics
- Heterogeneity in economics
- Study heterogeneity, a concept in statistics
- Heterogeneous relation

== Biology and medicine ==
- Heterogeneous conditions in medicine are those conditions which have several causes/etiologies
- A heterogeneous taxon, a taxon that contains a great variety of individuals or sub-taxa; usually this implies that the taxon is an artificial grouping
- Genetic heterogeneity, multiple origins causing the same disorder in different individuals.
- Allelic heterogeneity, different mutations at the same locus causing the same disorder.

== Chemistry ==
- A heterogeneous reaction, a reaction in chemical kinetics that takes place at the interface of two or more phases, i.e. between a solid and a gas, a liquid and a gas, or a solid and a liquid
- A heterogeneous catalysis, one in which the catalyst is in a different phase from the substrate

== Ecology ==
- Heterogeneity in landscape ecology, the measure of how different parts of a landscape are from one another.

== Computer science ==
- Heterogeneous computing, electronic systems that utilize a variety of different types of computational units
- Semantic heterogeneity, where there are differences in meaning and interpretation across data sources and datasets
- A data resource with multiple types of formats.

== See also ==
- Homogeneity and heterogeneity
- Homogeneity (disambiguation)
- Degeneracy
