= Absolutely integrable function =

Function whose absolute value has a finite integral

In mathematics, an absolutely integrable function is a function whose absolute value is integrable, meaning that the integral of the absolute value over the whole domain is finite.

For a real-valued function, since
$$\int |f(x)| \, dx = \int f^+(x) \, dx + \int f^-(x) \, dx$$
where
$$f^+(x) = \max (f(x),0), \ \ \  f^-(x) = \max(-f(x),0),$$

both $\int f^+(x) \, dx$ and $\int f^-(x) \, dx$ must be finite. In Lebesgue integration, this is exactly the requirement for any measurable function f to be considered integrable, with the integral then equaling $\int f^+(x) \, dx - \int f^-(x) \, dx$, so that in fact "absolutely integrable" means the same thing as "Lebesgue integrable" for measurable functions.

The same thing goes for a complex-valued function. Let us define
$$f^+(x) = \max(\Re f(x),0)$$
$$f^-(x) = \max(-\Re f(x),0)$$
$$f^{+i}(x) = \max(\Im f(x),0)$$
$$f^{-i}(x) = \max(-\Im f(x),0)$$
where $\Re f(x)$ and $\Im f(x)$ are the real and imaginary parts of $f(x)$. Then
$$|f(x)| \le f^+(x) + f^-(x) + f^{+i}(x) + f^{-i}(x) \le \sqrt{2}\,|f(x)|$$
so
$$\int |f(x)| \, dx \le \int f^+(x) \, dx + \int f^-(x) \, dx + \int f^{+i}(x) \, dx + \int f^{-i}(x) \, dx \le \sqrt{2}\int|f(x)| \, dx$$
This shows that the sum of the four integrals (in the middle) is finite if and only if the integral of the absolute value is finite, and the function is Lebesgue integrable only if all the four integrals are finite. So having a finite integral of the absolute value is equivalent to the conditions for the function to be "Lebesgue integrable".
