= Transform coding =

Data compression

Transform coding is a type of data compression for "natural" data like audio signals or photographic images. The transformation is typically lossless (perfectly reversible) on its own but is used to enable better (more targeted) quantization, which then results in a lower quality copy of the original input (lossy compression).

In transform coding, knowledge of the application is used to choose information to discard, thereby lowering its bandwidth. The remaining information can then be compressed via a variety of methods. When the output is decoded, the result may not be identical to the original input, but is expected to be close enough for the purpose of the application.

== Colour television ==
=== NTSC ===
One of the most successful transform encoding system is typically not referred to as such—the example being NTSC color television. After an extensive series of studies in the 1950s, Alda Bedford showed that the human eye has high resolution only for black and white, somewhat less for "mid-range" colors like yellows and greens, and much less for colors on the end of the spectrum, reds and blues.

Using this knowledge allowed RCA to develop a system in which they discarded most of the blue signal after it comes from the camera, keeping most of the green and only some of the red; this is chroma subsampling in the YIQ color space.

The result is a signal with considerably less content, one that would fit within existing 6 MHz black-and-white signals as a phase modulated differential signal. The average TV displays the equivalent of 350 pixels on a line, but the TV signal contains enough information for only about 50 pixels of blue and perhaps 150 of red. This is not apparent to the viewer in most cases, as the eye makes little use of the "missing" information anyway.

=== PAL and SECAM ===
The PAL and SECAM systems use nearly identical or very similar methods to transmit colour. In any case both systems are subsampled.

== Digital ==
The term is much more commonly used in digital media and digital signal processing. The most widely used transform coding technique in this regard is the discrete cosine transform (DCT), proposed by Nasir Ahmed in 1972, and presented by Ahmed with T. Natarajan and K. R. Rao in 1974. This DCT, in the context of the family of discrete cosine transforms, is the DCT-II. It is the basis for the common JPEG image compression standard, which examines small blocks of the image and transforms them to the frequency domain for more efficient quantization (lossy) and data compression. In video coding, the H.26x and MPEG standards modify this DCT image compression technique across frames in a motion image using motion compensation, further reducing the size compared to a series of JPEGs.

In audio coding, MPEG audio compression analyzes the transformed data according to a psychoacoustic model that describes the human ear's sensitivity to parts of the signal, similar to the TV model. MP3 uses a hybrid coding algorithm, combining the modified discrete cosine transform (MDCT) and fast Fourier transform (FFT). It was succeeded by Advanced Audio Coding (AAC), which uses a pure MDCT algorithm to significantly improve compression efficiency.

The basic process of digitizing an analog signal is a kind of transform coding that uses sampling in one or more domains as its transform.

== See also ==
- Karhunen–Loève theorem
- Transformation (function)
- Wavelet transform
