= Wang Yao =

Wang Yao may refer to:

- Xia Jia, real name Wang Yao, Chinese novelist
- Yao Wang, Chinese-American video engineer
