= ADST =

ADST may refer to:

- Association for Diplomatic Studies and Training, an American nonprofit organization
- Australian Daylight Saving Time
- Asymmetric discrete sine transform
