= E-CORCE =

e-CORCE (e-Continuous Observing system Relayed by Cellular processing Environment) was a planned remote sensing satellite constellation from CNES (Centre National d’Etudes Spatiales), slated for launch in 2014.

Designed by an engineer from CNES, JP Antikidis, in the frame of a prospective unit led by JJ Favier, the proposed project would revolutionize satellite Earth observation methodologies by allowing at acceptable cost a rapid coverage of the entire planet (1 day to 1 week) with high resolution (metric) color pictures. The solutions use image compression (psycho-visual) coupled with new methods of receiving and processing information distributed across the planet. The project aims by 2014 to photograph all of the continents in color at a resolution of 1 meter, every week, with a constellation of 13 Earth-orbiting microsatellites at 600 km, imaging everything in their path and down-linking compressed data to processing centers on the world.

== Definition ==
e-CORCE (e-Continuous Observing system Relayed by Cellular processing Environment) can be defined as follows:

- “e-” -Product for Internet based mass market operators.
- “Continuous Observing”- Continuously refreshed view of Earth.
- “Relayed by Cellular processing Environment”- Based on the cellular layers of Space, Telecom, and Grid.

"e-Constellation of Observation by Recurrent Cellular Environment" combining of three technological "cells" (space, telecom, Grid) to produce a multi-spectral image of the Earth. "e" as intended to feed the new vectors of the mass-based Internet, "Constellation" because relying on a constellation of satellites observing the Earth in "saturation" REcurrent "because based on a systematic information delivery high resolution refreshed daily to weekly. "Cellular " because using the combined virtues of new technology based on cellular processing (Wide Area Grid) distributed across the full globe.
