= Conjugate symmetry =

In mathematics, conjugate symmetry may refer to:

- The conjugate symmetry property of an inner product space
- Functions that are conjugate-symmetric
