= High-Definition Coding =

Audio codec

HDC (Hybrid Digital Coding or High-Definition Coding) with SBR (spectral band replication) is a proprietary lossy audio compression codec developed by iBiquity for use with HD Radio. It replaced the earlier PAC codec in 2003. In June 2017, the format was reverse engineered and determined to be a variant of HE-AACv1. It uses a modified discrete cosine transform (MDCT) audio coding data compression algorithm.
