= List of Fourier-related transforms =

This is a list of linear transformations of functions related to Fourier analysis. Such transformations map a function to a set of coefficients of basis functions, where the basis functions are sinusoidal and are therefore strongly localized in the frequency spectrum. (These transforms are generally designed to be invertible.) In the case of the Fourier transform, each basis function corresponds to a single frequency component.

== Continuous transforms ==
Applied to functions of continuous arguments, Fourier-related transforms include:

- Two-sided Laplace transform
- Mellin transform, another closely related integral transform
- Laplace transform: the Fourier transform may be considered a special case of the imaginary axis of the bilateral Laplace transform
- Fourier transform, with special cases:
  - Fourier series
    - When the input function/waveform is periodic, the Fourier transform output is a Dirac comb function, modulated by a discrete sequence of finite-valued coefficients that are complex-valued in general. These are called Fourier series coefficients. The term Fourier series actually refers to the inverse Fourier transform, which is a sum of sinusoids at discrete frequencies, weighted by the Fourier series coefficients.
    - When the non-zero portion of the input function has finite duration, the Fourier transform is continuous and finite-valued. But a discrete subset of its values is sufficient to reconstruct/represent the portion that was analyzed. The same discrete set is obtained by treating the duration of the segment as one period of a periodic function and computing the Fourier series coefficients.
  - Sine and cosine transforms:
    - When the input function has odd or even symmetry around the origin, the Fourier transform reduces to a sine transform or a cosine transform, respectively. Because functions can be uniquely decomposed into an odd function plus an even function, their respective sine and cosine transforms can be added to express the function.
    - The Fourier transform can be expressed as the cosine transform minus $\sqrt{\text{-1}}$ times the sine transform.
- Hartley transform
- Short-time Fourier transform (or short-term Fourier transform) (STFT)
  - Rectangular mask short-time Fourier transform
- Chirplet transform
- Fractional Fourier transform (FRFT)
- Hankel transform: related to the Fourier Transform of radial functions.
- Fourier–Bros–Iagolnitzer transform
- Linear canonical transform

== Discrete transforms ==
For usage on computers, number theory and algebra, discrete arguments (e.g. functions of a series of discrete samples) are often more appropriate, and are handled by the transforms (analogous to the continuous cases above):

- Discrete-time Fourier transform (DTFT): Equivalent to the Fourier transform of a "continuous" function that is constructed from the discrete input function by using the sample values to modulate a Dirac comb. When the sample values are derived by sampling a function on the real line, ƒ(x), the DTFT is equivalent to a periodic summation of the Fourier transform of ƒ. The DTFT output is always periodic (cyclic). An alternative viewpoint is that the DTFT is a transform to a frequency domain that is bounded (or finite), the length of one cycle.
  - discrete Fourier transform (DFT):
    - When the input sequence is periodic, the DTFT output is also a Dirac comb function, modulated by the coefficients of a Fourier series which can be computed as a DFT of one cycle of the input sequence. The number of discrete values in one cycle of the DFT is the same as in one cycle of the input sequence.
    - When the non-zero portion of the input sequence has finite duration, the DTFT is continuous and finite-valued. But a discrete subset of its values is sufficient to reconstruct/represent the portion that was analyzed. The same discrete set is obtained by treating the duration of the segment as one cycle of a periodic function and computing the DFT.
  - Discrete sine and cosine transforms: When the input sequence has odd or even symmetry around the origin, the DTFT reduces to a discrete sine transform (DST) or discrete cosine transform (DCT).
    - Regressive discrete Fourier series, in which the period is determined by the data rather than fixed in advance.
  - Discrete Chebyshev transforms (on the 'roots' grid and the 'extrema' grid of the Chebyshev polynomials of the first kind). This transform is of much importance in the field of spectral methods for solving differential equations because it can be used to swiftly and efficiently go from grid point values to Chebyshev series coefficients.
- Generalized DFT (GDFT), a generalization of the DFT and constant modulus transforms where phase functions might be of linear with integer and real valued slopes, or even non-linear phase bringing flexibilities for optimal designs of various metrics, e.g. auto- and cross-correlations.
- Discrete-space Fourier transform (DSFT) is the generalization of the DTFT from 1D signals to 2D signals. It is called "discrete-space" rather than "discrete-time" because the most prevalent application is to imaging and image processing where the input function arguments are equally spaced samples of spatial coordinates $(x,y)$. The DSFT output is periodic in both variables.
- Z-transform, a generalization of the DTFT to the entire complex plane
- Modified discrete cosine transform (MDCT)
- Discrete Hartley transform (DHT)
- Also the discretized STFT (see above).
- Hadamard transform (Walsh function).
- Fourier transform on finite groups.
- Discrete Fourier transform (general).

The use of all of these transforms is greatly facilitated by the existence of efficient algorithms based on a fast Fourier transform (FFT). The Nyquist–Shannon sampling theorem is critical for understanding the output of such discrete transforms.

== See also ==
- Integral transform
- Wavelet transform
- Fourier-transform spectroscopy
- Harmonic analysis
- List of transforms
- List of mathematic operators
- Bispectrum
