= Nasir Ahmed (engineer) =

Indian-American electrical engineer and computer scientist (born 1940)

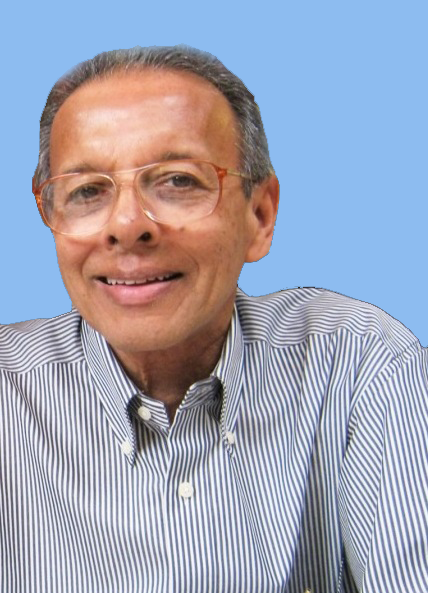
- Nasir Ahmed in 2012
- Born: 1940 (age 85–86); Bangalore, Kingdom of Mysore, British India
- Education: Bishop Cotton Boys' School; University of Visvesvaraya College of Engineering (BSc), University of New Mexico (MSc, PhD)
- Known for: Discrete cosine transform (DCT); Inverse DCT (IDCT); DCT lossy compression; DCT image compression; Lossless DCT (LDCT); Discrete sine transform (DST)
- Spouse: Esther Parente-Ahmed
- Children: Michael Ahmed Parente
- Awards: 1982 Distinguished Graduate Faculty Member Award Kansas State University; 1985 IEEE Fellow; 2001 Distinguished Engineering Alumnus Award University of New Mexico; 2025 Honorary Doctor of Science, University of New Mexico; 2025 IET J. J. Thomson Medal; 2026 IEEE Fourier Award for Signal Processing; 2026 Member of the National Academy of Engineering; 2026 Prince Philip Medal of the Royal Academy of Engineering
- Scientific career
- Fields: Electrical Engineering; Computer science
- Thesis: Derivation Of Transfer Functions From Time Delay Specifications And Their Approximations (1966)
- Doctoral advisor: Shlomo Karni

Nasir Ahmed (born 1940) is an American electrical engineer and computer scientist. He is Professor Emeritus of Electrical and Computer Engineering at University of New Mexico (UNM). He is best known for inventing the discrete cosine transform (DCT) in the early 1970s. The DCT is the most widely used data compression transformation, the basis for most digital media standards (image, video and audio) and commonly used in digital signal processing. He also described the discrete sine transform (DST), which is related to the DCT.

== Discrete cosine transform (DCT) ==
The discrete cosine transform (DCT) is a lossy compression algorithm that was first conceived by Ahmed while working at the Kansas State University, and he proposed the technique to the National Science Foundation in 1972. He originally intended the DCT for image compression. Ahmed developed a working DCT algorithm with his PhD student T. Natarajan and friend K. R. Rao in 1973, and they presented their results in a January 1974 paper. It described what is now called the type-II DCT (DCT-II), as well as its inverse, the type-III DCT (a.k.a. IDCT).

Ahmed was the leading author of the benchmark publication, Discrete Cosine Transform (with T. Natarajan and K. R. Rao), which has been cited as a fundamental development in many works since its publication. The basic research work and events that led to the development of the DCT were summarized in a later publication by Ahmed entitled "How I came up with the Discrete Cosine Transform".

The DCT is widely used for digital image compression. It is a core component of the 1992 JPEG image compression technology developed by the JPEG Experts Group working group and standardized jointly by the ITU, ISO and IEC. A tutorial discussion of how it is used to achieve digital video compression in various international standards defined by ITU and MPEG (Moving Picture Experts Group) is available in a paper by K. R. Rao and J. J. Hwang which was published in 1996, and an overview was presented in two 2006 publications by Yao Wang. The image and video compression properties of the DCT resulted in its being an integral component of the following widely used international standard technologies:

Standard	Technologies
JPEG	Storage and transmission of photographic images on the World Wide Web (JPEG/JFIF); and widely used in digital cameras and other photographic image capture devices (JPEG/Exif).
MPEG-1 Video	Video distribution on CD or via the World Wide Web.
MPEG-2 Video (or H.262)	Storage and handling of digital images in broadcast applications: digital TV, HDTV, cable, satellite, high speed internet; video distribution on DVD.
H.261	First of a family of video coding standards (1988). Used primarily in older video conferencing and video telephone products.
H.263	Videotelephony and videoconferencing

The form of DCT used in signal compression applications is sometimes referred to as DCT-2 in the context of a family of discrete cosine transforms, or as DCT-II.

More recent standards have used integer-based transforms that have similar properties to the DCT but are explicitly based on integer processing rather than being defined by trigonometric functions. As a result of these transforms having similar symmetry properties to the DCT and being, to some degree, approximations of the DCT, they have sometimes been called "integer DCT" transforms. Such transforms are used for video compression in the following technologies pertaining to more recent standards. The "integer DCT" designs are conceptually similar to the conventional DCT but are simplified to provide exactly specified decoding with reduced computational complexity.

Standard	Technologies
VC-1	Windows media video 9, SMPTE 421.
H.264/MPEG-4 AVC	The most commonly used format for recording, compression and distribution of high definition video; streaming internet video; Blu-ray Discs; HDTV broadcasts (terrestrial, cable and satellite).
H.265/HEVC	Successor to the H.264/MPEG-4 AVC standard having substantially improved compression capability.
H.266/VVC	Successor to HEVC having substantially improved compression capability.
WebP Images	A graphic format that supports the lossy compression of digital images. Developed by Google.
WebM Video	A multimedia open source format intended to be used with HTML5. Developed by Google.

A DCT variant, the modified discrete cosine transform (MDCT), is used in modern audio compression formats such as MP3, Advanced Audio Coding (AAC), and Vorbis (OGG).

The discrete sine transform (DST) is derived from the DCT, by replacing the Neumann condition at x=0 with a Dirichlet condition. The DST was described in the 1974 paper by Ahmed, Natarajan and Rao.

Ahmed later was involved in the development a DCT lossless compression algorithm with Giridhar Mandyam and Neeraj Magotra at the University of New Mexico in 1995. This allows the DCT technique to be used for lossless compression of images. It is a modification of the original DCT algorithm, and incorporates elements of inverse DCT and delta modulation. It is a more effective lossless compression algorithm than entropy coding.

== Background ==
- Alumnus of the Bishop Cotton Boys' School; received his B.S. degree in electrical engineering from the University of Visvesvaraya College of Engineering, Bangalore in 1961;
- Received his M.S. and Ph.D. degrees in electrical and computer engineering from the University of New Mexico in 1963 and 1966, respectively. His doctoral dissertation adviser was Shlomo Karni;
- Principal research engineer, Honeywell, St. Paul, Minnesota, from 1966 to 1968;
- Professor, Electrical and Computer Engineering Department, Kansas State University, 1968–83;
- 1983-2001: University of New Mexico—Presidential Professor of Electrical and Computer Engineering, 1983–89; chair, Department of Electrical and Computer Engineering, 1989–94; dean of engineering, 1994–96; associate provost for research and dean of graduate studies, 1996–2001;
- Consultant, Sandia National Laboratories, Albuquerque, New Mexico, 1976–90.
- Married to Esther Parente-Ahmed. Son, Michael Ahmed Parente.

== Books ==
- —; Rao, Kamisetty Ramamohan (7 August 1975). Orthogonal Transforms for Digital Signal Processing. New York: Springer-Verlag. doi:10.1109/ICASSP.1976.1170121. ISBN 978-3540065562. LCCN 73018912. OCLC 438821458. OL 22806004M. S2CID 10776771.
- —; Natarajan, T. Raj (1 March 1983). Discrete-Time Signals and Systems. Reston Publishing Company. doi:10.1017/cbo9781107444454.005. ISBN 978-0835913751. LCCN 82009146. OCLC 916671412. OL 22246478M. S2CID 60330579.

== Popular culture ==
In season 5, episode 8 of NBC's This Is Us, Ahmed's story was told to highlight the importance of image and video transmission over the Internet in modern society, particularly during the COVID-19 pandemic. The episode ends with a picture of Ahmed and his wife, along with captions explaining the importance of his work, and that producers spoke to the couple over video chat to understand their story and incorporate it into the episode.
