= K. R. Rao =

Indian-American electrical engineer (1931 - 2021)

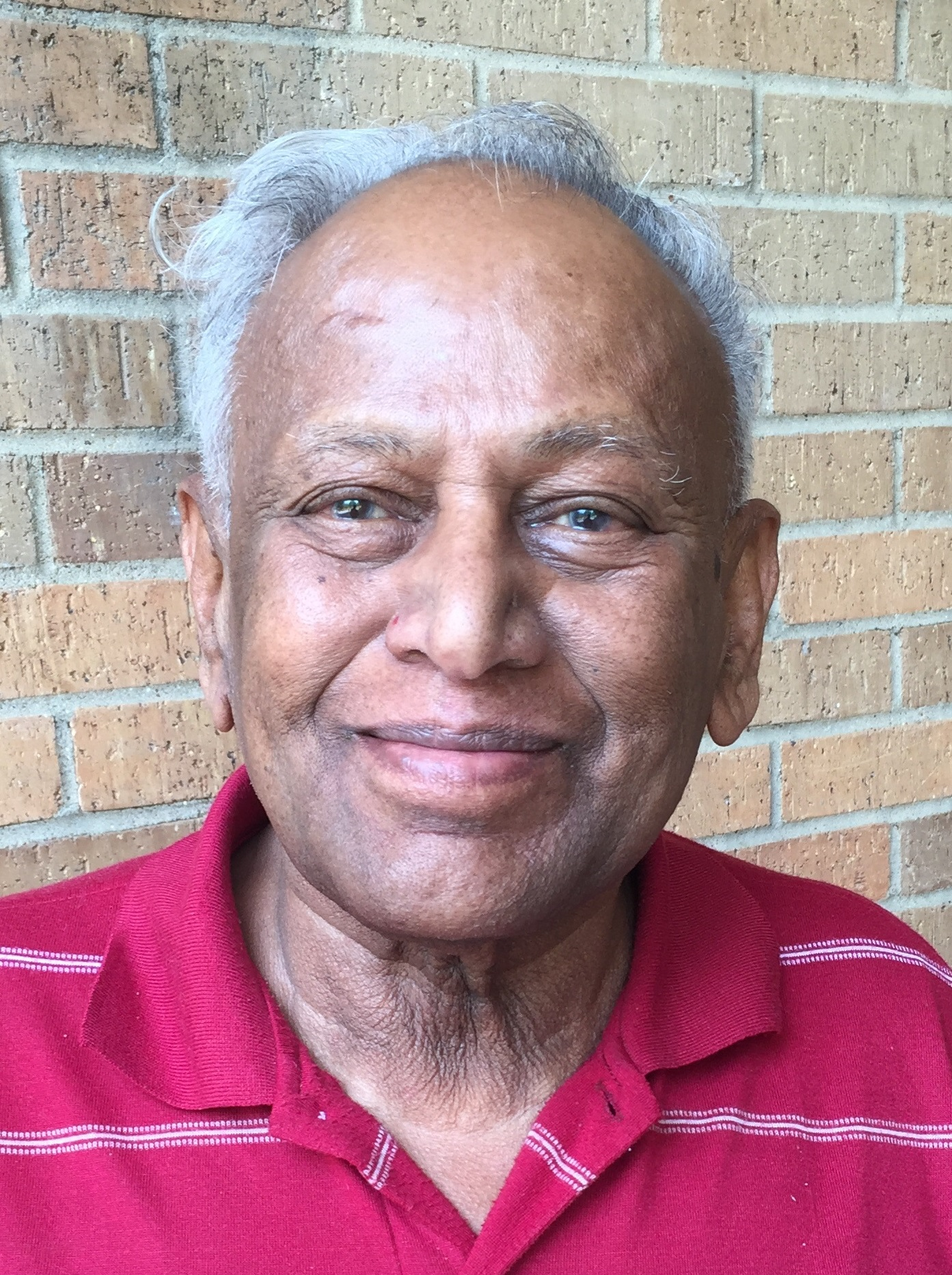
- K. R. Rao
- Born: 27 August 1931; Madras, Madras Presidency, British India (now Chennai, Tamil Nadu, India)
- Died: 15 January 2021 (aged 89); Arlington, Texas, United States
- Education: College of Engineering, Guindy; University of Florida; University of New Mexico
- Known for: Discrete Cosine Transform
- Awards: Fulbright Scholar
- Scientific career
- Fields: Electrical Engineering

Kamisetty Ramamohan Rao (1931 – 2021) was an Indian-American electrical engineer. He was a professor of Electrical Engineering at the University of Texas at Arlington (UT Arlington). Academically known as K. R. Rao, he is credited with the co-invention of discrete cosine transform (DCT), along with Nasir Ahmed and T. Natarajan due to their landmark publication, Discrete Cosine Transform.

== Education ==
Rao received a Bachelor of Science in Electrical Engineering from the College of Engineering, Guindy, affiliated with the University of Madras, in 1952. In 1959, he received his Master of Science Electrical Engineering degree from the University of Florida in 1959 followed by a Master of Science in Nuclear Engineering from the University of Florida in 1960. He received a Ph.D. degree in Electrical Engineering from the University of New Mexico, Albuquerque in 1966.

== Career ==
Rao had been with the University of Texas at Arlington since 1966. He was a professor of electrical engineering, and the director of the Multimedia Processing Laboratory. He also taught undergraduate courses on Discrete Signals and Systems and Fundamentals of Telecommunication systems. He also taught graduate courses on Digital Video Coding, Digital Image Processing, Discrete Transforms, and Multimedia Processing.

He had been an external examiner for graduate students from universities in Australia, Canada, Hong Kong, India, Singapore, Thailand, and Taiwan. He was a visiting professor at universities in Australia, India, Japan, Korea, Singapore, and Thailand. He conducted workshops/tutorials on video/audio coding/standards worldwide. He advised more than a hundred graduate students. He published in refereed journals and has been a consultant to industry, research institutes, law firms, and academia.

He was a Fellow of the IEEE. He is a member of the Academy of Distinguished Scholars, UTA. He was invited to be a panelist for the 2011 NSF Graduate Research Fellowship Program (GRFP), with service on the Electrical Engineering Panel. He was a panelist for the US EPA STAR fellowship program during 2013 and 2015 in Chantilly, Virginia.

=== Discrete cosine transform ===
Rao, along with Nasir Ahmed and T. Natarajan, introduced the discrete cosine transform (DCT) in 1974 which has since become very popular in digital signal processing. DCT, INTDCT, directional DCT and MDCT (modified DCT) have been adopted in several international video/image/audio coding standards such as JPEG/MPEG/H.26X series and also by SMPTE (VC-1) and by AVS China.

== Publications ==
- Ahmed, Nasir; Natarajan, T. Raj; — (1 January 1974). "Discrete Cosine Transform". IEEE Transactions on Computers. C-23 (1). IEEE Computer Society: 90–93. doi:10.1109/T-C.1974.223784. eISSN 1557-9956. ISSN 0018-9340. LCCN 75642478. OCLC 1799331. S2CID 206619973.
- Ahmed, Nasir; — (7 August 1975). Orthogonal Transforms for Digital Signal Processing. New York: Springer-Verlag. doi:10.1109/ICASSP.1976.1170121. ISBN 978-3540065562. LCCN 73018912. OCLC 438821458. OL 22806004M. S2CID 10776771.
- Elliott, Douglas F.; — (11 February 1983). Fast Transforms Algorithms, Analyses, Applications (1st ed.). Orlando, Florida: Academic Press. ISBN 978-0122370809. LCCN 79008852. OCLC 471811324. OL 33490917M – via Internet Archive.
- — (1 January 1985). Discrete Transforms And Their Applications. Benchmark Papers in Electrical Engineering and Computer Science. Van Nostrand Reinhold. ISBN 978-0442276690. LCCN 84020832. OCLC 246796185. OL 2858181M. S2CID 118773622.
- —; Srinivasan, Ram (1 September 1985). Teleconferencing. Benchmark Papers in Electrical Engineering and Computer Science. Van Nostrand Reinhold. ISBN 978-0442278267. LCCN 85006078. OCLC 11867822. OL 3025695M – via Internet Archive.
- —; Yip, Patrick C. (11 September 1990). Discrete Cosine Transform: Algorithms, Advantages, Applications. Signal, Image and Speech Processing. Academic Press. arXiv:1109.0337. doi:10.1016/c2009-0-22279-3. ISBN 978-0125802031. LCCN 89029800. OCLC 1008648293. OL 2207570M. S2CID 12270940.
- —; Hwang, J. J. (18 July 1996). Techniques and Standards for Image, Video, and Audio Coding. Prentice Hall. ISBN 978-0133099072. LCCN 96015550. OCLC 34617596. OL 978319M. S2CID 56983045.
- —; Bojkovic, Zoran S. (15 April 2000). Packet Video Communications over ATM Networks (1st ed.). Prentice Hall. ISBN 978-0130115188. LCCN 99044156. OCLC 247762667. OL 10073693M. S2CID 57275175.
- —; Yip, Patrick C. (27 September 2000). The Transform and Data Compression Handbook. Electrical Engineering & Applied Signal Processing Series. CRC Press. doi:10.1201/9781420037388. ISBN 978-0125802031. LCCN 00057149. OCLC 44468841. OL 19020123M. S2CID 116261584.
- —; Bojkovic, Zoran S.; Milovanovic, Dragorad A. (6 May 2002). Multimedia Communication Systems: Techniques, Standards, and Networks. Prentice Hall. ISBN 978-0130313980. LCCN 2002021427. OCLC 807397722. OL 9285737M. S2CID 59669344.
- Wu, H. R.; — (18 November 2005). The Transform and Data Compression Handbook. Signal Processing and Communications. CRC Press. doi:10.1201/9781420037388. ISBN 978-0824727772. LCCN 2005051404. OCLC 781375718. OL 34589317M. S2CID 116261584.
- —; Bojkovic, Zoran S.; Milovanovic, Dragorad A. (3 January 2006). Introduction to Multimedia Communications: Applications, Middleware, Networking. Prentice Hall. doi:10.1002/0471656399. ISBN 978-0471467427. LCCN 2005001259. OCLC 940714465. OL 3392250M. S2CID 60544523.
- Britanak, Vladimir; Yip, Patrick C.; — (6 November 2006). Discrete Cosine and Sine Transforms: General Properties, Fast Algorithms and Integer Approximations. Academic Press. ISBN 978-0123736246. LCCN 2006931102. OCLC 220853454. OL 18495589M. S2CID 118873224.
- —; Kim, Do Nyeon; Hwang, Jae Jeong (7 October 2010). Fast Fourier Transform - Algorithms and Applications. Signals and Communication Technology (2010th ed.). Springer. doi:10.1007/978-1-4020-6629-0. ISBN 978-1402066283. LCCN 2010934857. OCLC 828528685. OL 25559230M. S2CID 117791909.
- —; Kim, Do Nyeon; Hwang, Jae Jeong (21 October 2013). Video coding standards: AVS China, H.264/MPEG-4 PART 10, HEVC, VP6, DIRAC and VC-1. Signals and Communication Technology (2014th ed.). Springer. doi:10.1007/978-94-007-6742-3. ISBN 978-9400767416. LCCN 2013939570. OCLC 1026103913. OL 27990888M. S2CID 39585218.
- —; Bojkovic, Zoran S.; Bakmaz, Bojan M. (24 June 2014). Wireless Multimedia Communication Systems: Design, Analysis, and Implementation (1st ed.). CRC Press. doi:10.1201/b17059. ISBN 978-1466566002. LCCN 2014007345. OCLC 1016108013. OL 28774961M. S2CID 63951744.
- —; Hwang, J. J.; Kim, D. N. (17 August 2017). High Efficiency Video Coding and Other Emerging Standards. Signal, Image and Speech Processing. River Publishers. doi:10.1201/9781003338406. ISBN 978-8793609037. OCLC 1008648293. OL 30586610M. S2CID 56901176.

== See also ==
- JPEG – This article contains an easily understood example of DCT transformation
- Modified discrete cosine transform
- Discrete sine transform
- Discrete Fourier transform
- List of Fourier-related transforms
