= Perceptual Audio Coder =

Lossy audio compression algorithm

Perceptual Audio Coder (PAC) is a lossy audio compression algorithm. It is used by Sirius Satellite Radio for their digital audio radio service.

== Development ==
The original version of PAC developed by James Johnston and Anibal Ferreira at AT&T's Bell Labs has a flexible format and bitrate. It provides efficient compression of high-quality audio over a variety of formats from 16 kbit/s for a monophonic channel to 1024 kbit/s for a 5.1 format with four or six auxiliary audio channels, and provisions for an ancillary (fixed rate) and auxiliary (variable rate) side data channel. For stereo audio signals, it is claimed that it provides near-CD quality at about 56-64 kbit/s, with transparent coding at bit rates approaching 128 kbit/s.

Over the years PAC has evolved considerably. A known software implementation of this codec is CelestialTech's AudioLib. Later, it was considerably improved and renamed to ePAC (enhanced Perceptual Audio Coder) by Lucent, available in the AudioVeda music library manager.

iBiquity initially tested PAC for the HD-Radio IBOC digital radio upgrade for FM and AM, but chose an MPEG4-derived codec, HE-AAC, instead. MPEG-2 AAC is substantially similar to the original AT&T PAC algorithm written by Johnston and Ferreira, including the specifics of stereo pair coding, bitstream sectioning, handling of 1 or 2 channels at a time, multiple codebooks responding to the same largest absolute value, and block switching triggers. The version of PAC tested for the MPEG-NBC (later to become AAC) trials used 1024/128 sample block lengths, rather than 512/128 sample block lengths.

== See also ==
- MP3
