= Yao Wang =

Chinese-American video engineer

Yao Wang is a Chinese-American video engineer whose research topics include networked video, video coding, computer vision, medical imaging, and the use of machine learning techniques to diagnose lymphedema and concussions. She is a professor of electrical and computer engineering and of biomedical engineering in the New York University Tandon School of Engineering, where she is also Associate Dean for Faculty Affairs and holds an affiliated faculty position in the Radiology Department of the New York University Grossman School of Medicine. She is also a member of NYU WIRELESS.

== Education and career ==
Wang has bachelor's and master's degrees in electronic engineering from Tsinghua University, awarded in 1983 and 1985, respectively. She completed her Ph.D. in electrical and computer engineering in 1990 at the University of California, Santa Barbara, and in the same year joined the faculty of the Polytechnic Institute of New York, the predecessor institution to the NYU Tandon School.

== Book ==
Wang is the coauthor, with Jörn Ostermann and Ya-Qin Zhang, of the textbook Video Processing and Communications (Prentice Hall, 2001).

== Recognition ==
Wang was named a Fellow of the IEEE in 2004, "for contributions to video processing and communication".
