= List of transforms =

This is a list of transforms in mathematics.

== Integral transforms ==
- Abel transform
- Aboodh transform
- Bateman transform
- Fourier transform
  - Fourier cosine transform
  - Fourier sine transform
  - Fractional Fourier transform
  - Short-time Fourier transform
    - Rectangular mask short-time Fourier transform
  - Fourier–Bros–Iagolnitzer transform
  - Gabor transform
- Hankel transform
- Hartley transform
- Hermite transform
- Hilbert transform
  - Hilbert–Schmidt integral operator
- Jacobi transform
- Laguerre transform
- Laplace transform
  - Inverse Laplace transform
  - Two-sided Laplace transform
  - Inverse two-sided Laplace transform
- Laplace–Carson transform
- Laplace–Stieltjes transform
- Legendre transform
- Linear canonical transform
- Mellin transform
  - Inverse Mellin transform
  - Poisson–Mellin–Newton cycle
- Radon transform
  - X-ray transform
- Shehu transform
- Stieltjes transformation
- Wavelet transform (integral)
- Weierstrass transform

== Discrete transforms ==
- Binomial transform
- Discrete Fourier transform, DFT
  - Fast Fourier transform, a popular implementation of the DFT
- Discrete cosine transform
  - Modified discrete cosine transform
- Discrete Hartley transform
- Discrete sine transform
- Discrete wavelet transform
- Hadamard transform (or, Walsh–Hadamard transform)
  - Fast wavelet transform
- Hankel transform, the determinant of the Hankel matrix
- Discrete Chebyshev transform
  - Equivalent, up to a diagonal scaling, to a discrete cosine transform
- Finite Legendre transform
- Irrational base discrete weighted transform
- Mojette transform
- Number-theoretic transform
- Spherical Harmonic transform
- Stirling transform

== Discrete-time transforms ==
These transforms have a continuous frequency domain:

- Discrete-time Fourier transform
- Z-transform

== Data-dependent transforms ==
- Karhunen–Loève transform

== Other transforms ==
- Affine transformation (Euclidean geometry)
- Bäcklund transform
- Bilinear transform
- Box–Muller transform
- Burrows–Wheeler transform (data compression)
- Chirplet transform
- Distance transform
- Fractal transform
- Gelfand transform
- Hadamard transform
- Hough transform (digital image processing)
- Inverse scattering transform
- Legendre transformation
- Möbius transformation
- Perspective transform (computer graphics)
- Sequence transform
- Watershed transform (digital image processing)
- Wavelet transform (orthonormal)
- Y-Δ transform (electrical circuits)

== See also ==
- Linear transform
- List of Fourier-related transforms
- Sequence transformation
- Transform coding
