= Shehu transform =

Integral transform generalizing both Laplace and Sumudu transforms

In mathematics, the Shehu transform is an integral transform which generalizes both the Laplace transform and the Sumudu transform. It was introduced by Shehu Maitama and Weidong Zhao in 2019 and applied to both ordinary differential equation and partial differential equation.

== Formal definition ==
The Shehu transform of a function $f(t)$ is defined over the set of functions

$A = \{f(t) : \exists M, p_1 ,p_2> 0 , |f(t)|< M \exp(|t|/p_i),\,\,\,\text{if}\,\,\,t\in(-1)^i\times[0,\,\infty) \}$

as

$\mathbb S[f(t)]=F(s,u)= \int_0^\infty\exp\left(-\frac{st}{u}\right)f(t) \, dt=\lim_{\alpha\rightarrow\infty}\int_0^\alpha\exp\left(-\frac{st}{u}\right)f(t) \, dt,\,s>0,\,u>0,\,\,\,\,(1)$

where $s$ and $u$ are the Shehu transform variables. The Shehu transform converges to Laplace transform when the variable $u = 1$.

== Inverse Shehu transform ==
The inverse Shehu transform of the function $f(t)$ is defined as

$f(t)=\mathbb S^{-1}[F(s,u)]=\lim_{\beta\rightarrow\infty}\frac{1}{2 \pi i}\int_{\alpha-i\beta}^{\alpha+i\beta}\frac{1}{u}\exp\left(\frac{st}{u}\right)F(s,u)ds,\,\,\,\,(2)$

where $s$ is a complex number and $\alpha$ is a real number.

== Properties and theorems ==
Properties of the Shehu transform
Property	Explanation
Linearity	For any functions $\alpha f(t)$, $\beta w(t)\in A,$ where $\alpha$, $\beta$ are arbitrary constants. Then, the Shehu transform satisfies ${\mathbb S}\left[\alpha f(t)+\beta w(t)\right]= \alpha{\mathbb S}\left[f(t)\right]+\beta{\mathbb S}\left[w(t)\right].$
Change of scale	Let the function $f(\beta t)$ be in set $A$, where $\beta$ is an arbitrary constant. Then ${\mathbb S}\left[f(\beta t)\right]=\frac{1}{\beta}F\left(\frac{s}{\beta},u\right).$
Exponential shifting	Let the function $\exp\left(\alpha t\right)f(t)$ be in set $A$ and $\alpha$ is an arbitrary constant. Then ${\mathbb S}\left[\exp\left(\alpha t\right)f(t)\right]=F(s-\alpha u, u).$
Multiple shift	Let ${\mathbb S}\left[f(t)\right]=F(s,u)$ and $f(t)\in A$. Then ${\mathbb S}\left[t^nf(t)\right]=(-u)^n\frac{d^n}{ds^n}F(s, u).$

=== Theorems ===
==== Shehu transform of integral ====
${\mathbb S}\left[\int_{0}^{t}f(\zeta)d\zeta\right]=\frac{u}{s}F(s,u),$

where ${\mathbb S}\left[f(\zeta)\right]=F(s,u)$ and $f(\zeta)\in A.$

==== nth derivatives of Shehu transform ====
If the function $f^{(n)}(t)$ is the nth derivative of the function $f(t)\in A$ with respect to $t$, then ${\mathbb S} \left[f^{(n)}(t)\right] =\left(\frac{s}{u}\right)^{n}F(s,u)- \sum_{k=0}^{n-1}\left(\frac{s}{u}\right)^{n-(k+1)}f^{(k)}(0).$

==== Convolution theorem of Shehu transform ====
Let the functions $f(t)$ and $g(t)$ be in set $A$. If $F(s,u)$ and $G(s,u)$ are the Shehu transforms of the functions $f(t)$ and $g(t)$ respectively. Then

${\mathbb S}\left[(f*g)(t)\right]=F(s,u)G(s,u).$

Where $f*g$ is the convolution of two functions $f(t)$ and $g(t)$ which is defined as

$\int _{0 }^{t}f(\tau)g(t-\tau)d\tau=\int _{0 }^{t }f(t-\tau)g(\tau)d\tau.$

==== Shehu transform of Caputo fractional order derivative ====
If $f\in AC^n(a,b)$ for $b>a$ and of exponential order. Then

$\mathbb S\left[^{C}D_t^{\alpha}f(t)\right]=\left(\frac{s}{u}\right)^\alpha {\mathbb S}\left[f(t)\right]-\sum_{k=0}^{m-1}\left(\frac{s}{u}\right)^{\alpha-k-1}f^{(k)}(0+)$,

where $\alpha>0,\,m=1+[\alpha].$

==== Shehu transform of Riemann-Liouville fractional order derivative ====
If $\alpha>0,\,\,m=1+[\alpha],$ and $f(t),\,I^{m-\alpha}f(t),\,\frac{d}{dt}I^{m-\alpha}f(t),\cdots,\,^{RL}Df(t)\in A.$ Then

$\mathbb S\left[^{RL}D_t^{\alpha} f(t)\right]=\left(\frac{s}{u}\right)^\alpha {\mathbb S} \left[f(t)\right]-\sum_{k=0}^{m-1}\left(\frac{s}{u}\right)^{m-k-1}\frac{d^{k-1}}{dt^{k-1}}I^{m-\alpha}f(0+)$,

where $\alpha>0,\,m=1+[\alpha].$

==== Shehu transform of Caputo-Fabrizio fractional derivative ====
The Shehu transform of Caputo-Fabrizio fractional derivative in Caputo sense is defined as

$\mathbb S\left[^{CFC}{_0}D_t^{\alpha} f(t)\right]=\frac{\mathcal{B}(\alpha)}{s+\alpha(u-s)}\left(sF(s,u)-uf(0)\right).$

==== Shehu transform of Atangana-Baleanu fractional derivative ====
The Shehu transform of Atangana-Baleanu fractional derivative in Caputo sense is defined as

$\mathbb S\left[^{ABC}{_0}D_t^{\alpha} f(t)\right]=\frac{\mathcal{B}(\alpha)}{1-\alpha+\alpha \left(\frac{u}{s}\right)^\alpha}\left(F(s,u)-\frac{u}{s}f(0)\right).$

==== Shehu transform of Atangana-Baleanu fractional derivative in Riemann-Liouville sense ====
The Shehu transform of Atangana-Baleanu fractional derivative in Riemann-Liouville sense is defined as

$\mathbb S\left[^{ABR}{_0}D_t^{\alpha}f(t)\right]=\frac{\mathcal{B}(\alpha)}{1-\alpha+\alpha \left(\frac{u}{s}\right)^\alpha}F(s,u).$

==== Shehu transform of regularized Prabhakar fractional derivative ====
The Shehu transform of regularized Prabhakar fractional derivative in Caputo sense is defined as

$\mathbb S\left[^{C}D_{\mu,\beta,\omega,0}^{\gamma} f(t)\right]=\left(\frac{u}{s}\right)^{-\beta}\left(1-\omega\left(\frac{u}{s}\right)^{\mu}\right)^\gamma F(s,u).$
