= Y and H transforms =

In mathematics, the Y transforms and H transforms are complementary pairs of integral transforms involving, respectively, the Neumann function (Bessel function of the second kind) Y_{ν} of order ν and the Struve function H_{ν} of the same order.

For a given function f(r), the Y-transform of order ν is given by

$$F(k) = \int_0^\infty f(r) Y_{\nu}(kr) \sqrt{kr} \, dr$$

The inverse of above is the H-transform of the same order; for a given function F(k), the H-transform of order ν is given by

$$f(r) = \int_0^\infty F(k) \mathbf{H}_{\nu}(kr) \sqrt{kr} \, dk$$

These transforms are closely related to the Hankel transform, as both involve Bessel functions. In problems of mathematical physics and applied mathematics, the Hankel, Y, H transforms all may appear in problems having axial symmetry. Hankel transforms are however much more commonly seen due to their connection with the 2-dimensional Fourier transform. The Y, H transforms appear in situations with singular behaviour on the axis of symmetry.

== Notes ==
- Bateman Manuscript Project: Tables of Integral Transforms Vol. II. Contains extensive tables of transforms: Chapter IX (Y-transforms) and Chapter XI (H-transforms).
- Rooney, P. G. (1980). "On the Y_{ν} and H_{ν} transformations". Canadian Journal of Mathematics. 32 (5): 1021–1044. doi:10.4153/CJM-1980-079-4.
