= List of mathematic operators =

In mathematics, an operator or transform is a function from one space of functions to another. Operators occur commonly in engineering, physics and mathematics. Many are integral operators and differential operators.

In the following L is an operator

$$L:\mathcal{F}\to\mathcal{G}$$

which takes a function $y\in\mathcal{F}$ to another function $L[y]\in\mathcal{G}$. Here, $\mathcal{F}$ and $\mathcal{G}$ are some unspecified function spaces, such as Hardy space, L^{p} space, Sobolev space, or, more vaguely, the space of holomorphic functions.

Expression	Curve definition	Variables	Description
Linear transformations
$L[y]=y^{(n)}$			Derivative of nth order
$L[y]=\int_a^t y \,dt$	Cartesian	$y=y(x)$ $x=t$	Integral, area
$L[y]=y\circ f$			Composition operator
$L[y]=\frac{y\circ t+y\circ -t}{2}$			Even component
$L[y]=\frac{y\circ t-y\circ -t}{2}$			Odd component
$L[y]=y\circ (t+1) - y\circ t = \Delta y$			Difference operator
$L[y]=y\circ (t) - y\circ (t-1) = \nabla y$			Backward difference (Nabla operator)
$L[y]=\sum y=\Delta^{-1}y$			Indefinite sum operator (inverse operator of difference)
$L[y] =-(py')'+qy$			Sturm–Liouville operator
Non-linear transformations
$F[y]=y^{[-1]}$			Inverse function
$F[y]=t\,y'^{[-1]} - y\circ y'^{[-1]}$			Legendre transformation
$F[y]=f\circ y$			Left composition
$F[y]=\prod y$			Indefinite product
$F[y]=\frac{y'}{y}$			Logarithmic derivative
$F[y]={\frac{ty'}{y}}$			Elasticity
$F[y]={y''' \over y'}-{3\over 2}\left({y''\over y'}\right)^2$			Schwarzian derivative
$F[y]=\int_a^t |y'| \,dt$			Total variation
$F[y]=\frac{1}{t-a}\int_a^t y\,dt$			Arithmetic mean
$F[y]=\exp \left( \frac{1}{t-a}\int_a^t \ln y\,dt \right)$			Geometric mean
$F[y]= -\frac{y}{y'}$	Cartesian	$y=y(x)$ $x=t$	Subtangent
$F[x,y]= -\frac{yx'}{y'}$	Parametric; Cartesian	$x=x(t)$ $y=y(t)$	Subtangent
$F[r]= -\frac{r^2}{r'}$	Polar	$r=r(\phi)$ $\phi=t$	Subtangent
$F[r]=\frac{1}{2}\int_a^t r^2 dt$	Polar	$r=r(\phi)$ $\phi=t$	Sector area
$F[y]= \int_a^t \sqrt { 1 + y'^2 }\, dt$	Cartesian	$y=y(x)$ $x=t$	Arc length
$F[x,y]= \int_a^t \sqrt { x'^2 + y'^2 }\, dt$	Parametric; Cartesian	$x=x(t)$ $y=y(t)$	Arc length
$F[r]= \int_a^t \sqrt { r^2 + r'^2 }\, dt$	Polar	$r=r(\phi)$ $\phi=t$	Arc length
$F[y] = \int_a^t\sqrt[3]{y''}\, dt$	Cartesian	$y=y(x)$ $x=t$	Affine arc length
$F[x,y] = \int_a^t\sqrt[3]{x'y''-x''y'}\, dt$	Parametric; Cartesian	$x=x(t)$ $y=y(t)$	Affine arc length
$F[x,y,z]=\int_a^t\sqrt[3]{z'''(x'y''-y'x'')+z''(x'''y'-x'y''')+z'(x''y'''-x'''y'')}dt$	Parametric; Cartesian	$x=x(t)$ $y=y(t)$ $z=z(t)$	Affine arc length
$F[y]=\frac{y''}{(1+y'^2)^{3/2}}$	Cartesian	$y=y(x)$ $x=t$	Curvature
$F[x,y]= \frac{x'y''-y'x''}{(x'^2+y'^2)^{3/2}}$	Parametric; Cartesian	$x=x(t)$ $y=y(t)$	Curvature
$F[r]=\frac{r^2+2r'^2-rr''}{(r^2+r'^2)^{3/2}}$	Polar	$r=r(\phi)$ $\phi=t$	Curvature
$F[x,y,z]=\frac{\sqrt{(z''y'-z'y'')^2+(x''z'-z''x')^2+(y''x'-x''y')^2}}{(x'^2+y'^2+z'^2)^{3/2}}$	Parametric; Cartesian	$x=x(t)$ $y=y(t)$ $z=z(t)$	Curvature
$F[y]=\frac{1}{3}\frac{y''''}{(y'')^{5/3}}-\frac{5}{9}\frac{y'''^2}{(y'')^{8/3}}$	Cartesian	$y=y(x)$ $x=t$	Affine curvature
$F[x,y]= \frac{x''y'''-x'''y''}{(x'y''-x''y')^{5/3}}-\frac{1}{2}\left[\frac{1}{(x'y''-x''y')^{2/3}}\right]''$	Parametric; Cartesian	$x=x(t)$ $y=y(t)$	Affine curvature
$F[x,y,z]=\frac{z'''(x'y''-y'x'')+z''(x'''y'-x'y''')+z'(x''y'''-x'''y'')}{(x'^2+y'^2+z'^2)(x''^2+y''^2+z''^2)}$	Parametric; Cartesian	$x=x(t)$ $y=y(t)$ $z=z(t)$	Torsion of curves
$X[x,y]=\frac{y'}{yx'-xy'}$ $Y[x,y]=\frac{x'}{xy'-yx'}$	Parametric; Cartesian	$x=x(t)$ $y=y(t)$	Dual curve (tangent coordinates)
$X[x,y]=x+\frac{ay'}{\sqrt {x'^2+y'^2}}$ $Y[x,y]=y-\frac{ax'}{\sqrt {x'^2+y'^2}}$	Parametric; Cartesian	$x=x(t)$ $y=y(t)$	Parallel curve
$X[x,y]=x+y'\frac{x'^2+y'^2}{x''y'-y''x'}$ $Y[x,y]=y+x'\frac{x'^2+y'^2}{y''x'-x''y'}$	Parametric; Cartesian	$x=x(t)$ $y=y(t)$	Evolute
$F[r]=t (r'\circ r^{[-1]})$	Intrinsic	$r=r(s)$ $s=t$	Evolute
$X[x,y]=x-\frac{x'\int_a^t \sqrt { x'^2 + y'^2 }\, dt}{\sqrt { x'^2 + y'^2 }}$ $Y[x,y]=y-\frac{y'\int_a^t \sqrt { x'^2 + y'^2 }\, dt}{\sqrt { x'^2 + y'^2 }}$	Parametric; Cartesian	$x=x(t)$ $y=y(t)$	Involute
$X[x,y]=\frac{(xy'-yx')y'}{x'^2 + y'^2}$ $Y[x,y]=\frac{(yx'-xy')x'}{x'^2 + y'^2}$	Parametric; Cartesian	$x=x(t)$ $y=y(t)$	Pedal curve with pedal point (0;0)
$X[x,y]=\frac{(x'^2-y'^2)y'+2xyx'}{xy'-yx'}$ $Y[x,y]=\frac{(x'^2-y'^2)x'+2xyy'}{xy'-yx'}$	Parametric; Cartesian	$x=x(t)$ $y=y(t)$	Negative pedal curve with pedal point (0;0)
$X[y] = \int_a^t \cos \left[\int_a^t \frac{1}{y} \,dt\right] dt$ $Y[y] = \int_a^t \sin \left[\int_a^t \frac{1}{y} \,dt\right] dt$	Intrinsic	$y=r(s)$ $s=t$	Intrinsic to Cartesian transformation
Metric functionals
$F[y]=\|y\|=\sqrt{\int_E y^2 \, dt}$			Norm
$F[x,y]=\int_E xy \, dt$			Inner product
$F[x,y]=\arccos \left[\frac{\int_E xy \, dt}{\sqrt{\int_E x^2 \, dt}\sqrt{\int_E y^2 \, dt}}\right]$			Fubini–Study metric (inner angle)
Distribution functionals
$F[x,y] = x * y = \int_E x(s) y(t - s)\, ds$			Convolution
$F[y] = \int_E y \ln y \, dt$			Differential entropy
$F[y] = \int_E yt\,dt$			Expected value
$F[y] = \int_E \left(t-\int_E yt\,dt\right)^2y\,dt$			Variance

== See also ==
- List of transforms
- List of Fourier-related transforms
- Transfer operator
- Fredholm operator
- Borel transform
- Glossary of mathematical symbols
