= Photofragment-ion imaging =

Experimental velocity measurement technique

Photofragment ion imaging (or product imaging) is an experimental technique for making measurements of the velocity of product molecules or particles following a chemical reaction or the photodissociation of a parent molecule. The method uses a two-dimensional detector, usually a microchannel plate, to record the arrival positions of state-selected ions created by resonance-enhanced multiphoton ionization (REMPI). The first experiment using photofragment ion imaging was performed by David W. Chandler and Paul L. Houston in 1987 on the phototodissociation dynamics of methyl iodide (iodomethane, CH_{3}I).

== Background ==
Many problems in molecular reaction dynamics demand the simultaneous measurement of a particle's speed and angular direction; the most demanding require the measurement of this velocity in coincidence with internal energy. Studies of molecular reactions, energy transfer processes and photodissociation can only be understood completely if the internal energies and velocities of all products can be specified. Product imaging approaches this goal by determining the three-dimensional velocity distribution of one state-selected product of the reaction. For a reaction producing two products, because the speed of the unobserved sibling product is related to that of the measured product through conservation of momentum and energy, the internal state of the sibling can often be inferred.

=== Example ===
A simple example illustrates the principle. Ozone (O_{3}) dissociates following ultraviolet excitation to yield an oxygen atom and an oxygen molecule. Although there are (at least) two possible channels, the principle products are O(^{1}D) and O_{2}(^{1}Δ); that is, both the atom and the molecule are in their first excited electronic state (see atomic term symbol and molecular term symbol for further explanation). At a wavelength of 266 nm, the photon has enough energy to dissociate ozone to these two products, to excite the O_{2}(^{1}Δ) vibrationally to a maximum level of v = 3, and to provide some energy to the recoil velocity between the two fragments. Of course, the more energy that is used to excite the O_{2} vibrations, the less will be available for the recoil. The O(1D) atom's REMPI, combined with the product imaging technique, yields an image that can be used to calculate the O(1D) three-dimensional velocity distribution. A slice through this cylindrically symmetric distribution is shown in the figure, where an O(^{1}D) atom that has zero velocity in the center-of-mass frame would arrive at the center of the figure. Note that there are four rings, corresponding to four main groups of O(^{1}D) speeds. These correspond to O2(1) production at vibrational levels v = 0, 1, 2, and 3. The ring corresponding to v = 0 is the outer one, since production of the O_{2}(^{1}Δ) in this level leaves the most energy for recoil between the O(^{1}D) and O_{2}(^{1}Δ). Thus, the product imaging technique immediately shows the vibrational distribution of the O_{2}(^{1}Δ).

Note that the angular distribution of the O(^{1}D) is not uniform – more of the atoms fly toward the north or south pole than to the equator. In this case, the north-south axis is parallel to the polarization direction of the light that dissociated the ozone. Ozone molecules that absorb the polarized light are those in a particular alignment distribution, with a line connecting the end oxygen atoms in O_{3} roughly parallel to the polarization. Because the ozone dissociates more rapidly than it rotates, the O and O_{2} products recoil predominantly along this polarization axis. But there is more detail as well. A close examination shows that the peak in the angular distribution is not actually exactly at the north or south pole, but rather at an angle of about 45 degrees. This has to do with the polarization of the laser that ionizes the O(^{1}D), and can be analyzed to show that the angular momentum of this atom (which has 2 units) is aligned relative to the velocity of recoil. More detail can be found elsewhere.

There are other dissociation channels available to ozone following excitation at this wavelength. One produces O(^{3}P) and O_{2}(^{3}Σ), indicating that both the atom and molecule are in their ground electronic state. The image above has no information on this channel, since only the O(^{1}D) is probed. However, by tuning the ionization laser to the REMPI wavelength of O(^{3}P) one finds a completely different image that provides information about the internal energy distribution of O_{2}(^{3}Σ).

== Product imaging ==
Schematic of Product Imaging Apparatus

In the original product imaging paper, the positions of the ions are imaged onto a two-dimensional detector. A photolysis laser dissociates methyl iodide (CH_{3}I), while an ionization laser is used REMPI to ionize a particular vibrational level of the CH_{3} product. Both lasers are pulsed, and the ionization laser is fired at a delay short enough that the products have not moved appreciably. Because ejection of an electron by the ionization laser does not change the recoil velocity of the CH_{3} fragment, its position at any time following the photolysis is nearly the same as it would have been as a neutral. The advantage of converting it to an ion is that, by repelling it with a set of grids (represented by the vertical solid lines in the figure), one can project it onto a two-dimensional detector. The detector is a double microchannel plate consisting of two glass discs with closely packed open channels (several micrometres in diameter). A high voltage is placed across the plates. As an ion hits inside a channel, it ejects secondary electrons that are then accelerated into the walls of the channel. Since multiple electrons are ejected for each one that hits the wall, the channels act as individual particle multipliers. At the far end of the plates approximately 10^{7} electrons leave the channel for each ion that entered. Importantly, they exit from a spot right behind where the ion entered. The electrons are then accelerated to a phosphor screen, and the spots of light are recorded with a gated charge-coupled device (CCD) camera. The image collected from each pulse of the lasers is then sent to a computer, and the results of many thousands of laser pulses are accumulated to provide an image such as the one for ozone shown previously.

In this position-sensing version of product imaging, the position of the ions as they hit the detector is recorded. One can imagine the ions produced by the dissociation and ionization lasers as expanding outward from the center-of-mass with a particular distribution of velocities. It is this three-dimensional object that we wish to detect. Since the ions created should be of the same mass, they will all be accelerated uniformly toward the detector. It takes very little time for the whole three-dimensional object to be crushed into the detector, so the position of an ion on the detector relative to the center position is given simply by v Δt, where v is its velocity and Δt is the time between when the ions were made and when they hit the detector. The image is thus a two-dimensional projection of the desired three-dimensional velocity distribution. Fortunately, for systems with an axis of cylindrical symmetry parallel to the surface of the detector, the three-dimensional distribution may be recovered from the two-dimensional projection by the use of the inverse Abel transform. The cylindrical axis is the axis containing the polarization direction of the dissociating light. The image is taken in the center-of-mass frame; no transformation, other than from time to speed, is needed.

A final advantage of the technique should also be mentioned: ions of different masses arrive at the detector at different times. This differential arises because each ion is accelerated to the same total energy, E, as it traverses the electric field, but the acceleration speed, v_{z}, varies as E = ½ mv_{z}^{2}. Thus, v_{z} varies as the reciprocal of the square root of the ion mass, or the arrival time is proportional to the square root of the ion mass. In a perfect experiment, the ionization laser would ionize only the products of the dissociation, and those only in a particular internal energy state. But the ionization laser, and perhaps the photolysis laser, can create ions from other material, such as pump oil or other impurities. The ability to selectively detect a single mass by gating the detector electronically is thus an important advantage in reducing noise.

== Improvements to the Product Imaging Technique ==
=== Velocity map imaging ===
A major improvement to the product imaging technique was achieved by Eppink and Parker. A difficulty that limits the resolution in the position-sensing version is that the spot on the detector is no smaller than the cross-sectional area of the ions excited. For example, if the volume of interaction of the molecular beam, photolysis laser, and ionization laser is, say 1 mm x 1 mm x 1 mm, then the spot for an ion moving with a single velocity would still span 1mm x 1mm at the detector. This dimension is much larger than the limit of a channel width (10 μm) and is substantial compared to the radius of a typical detector (25 mm). Without some further improvement, the velocity resolution for a position-sensing apparatus would be limited to about one part in twenty-five. Eppink and Parker found a way around this limit. Their version of the product imaging technique is called velocity map imaging.

Velocity map imaging is based on the use of an electrostatic lens to accelerate the ions toward the detector. When the voltages are properly adjusted, this lens has the advantage that it focuses ions with the same velocity to a single spot on the detector regardless where the ion was created. This technique thus overcomes the blurring caused by the finite overlap of the laser and molecular beams.

In addition to ion imaging, velocity map imaging is also used for electron kinetic energy analysis in photoelectron photoion coincidence spectroscopy and photoelectron spectroscopy.

=== Three-Dimensional (3D) Ion Imaging ===
Chichinin, Einfeld, Maul, and Gericke replaced the phosphor screen by a time-resolving delay line anode in order to be able to measure all three components of the initial product momentum vector simultaneously for each individual product particle arriving at the detector. This technique allows one to measure the three-dimensional product momentum vector distribution without having to rely on mathematical reconstruction methods which require the investigated systems to be cylindrically symmetric. Later, velocity mapping was added to 3D imaging. 3D techniques have been used to characterize several elementary photodissociation processes and bimolecular chemical reactions.

=== Centroiding ===
Chang et al., realized that further increase in resolution could be gained if one carefully analyzed the results of each spot detected by the CCD camera. Under the microchannel plate amplification typical in most laboratories, each such spot was 5-10 pixels in diameter. By programming a microprocessor to examine each of up to 200 spots per laser shot to determine the center of the distribution of each spot, Chang et al. were able to further increase the velocity resolution to the equivalent of one pixel out of the 256-pixel radius of the CCD chip.

=== DC Slice Imaging ===
DC slice imaging is a developed version of traditional velocity map imaging technique which was developed in Suits group. In DC slicing, the ion cloud is allowed to expand by a weaker field in the ionization region. By this the arrival time is expanded to several hundred ns. By a fast transistor switch, one is able to select the central part of the ion cloud (Newton sphere). This central slice has the full velocity and angular distribution. A reconstruction by mathematical methods is not necessary. (D. Townsend, S. K. Lee and A. G. Suits, “Orbital polarization from DC slice imaging: S(1D) alignment in the photodissociation of ethylene sulfide,” Chem. Phys., 301, 197 (2004).)

=== Electron Imaging ===
Product imaging of positive ions formed by REMPI detection is only one of the areas where charged particle imaging has become useful. Another area was in the detection of electrons. The first ideas along these lines seem to have an early history. Demkov et al. were perhaps the first to propose a "photoionization microscope". They realized that trajectories of an electron emitted from an atom in different directions may intersect again at a large distance from the atom and create an interference pattern. They proposed building an apparatus to observe the predicted rings. Blondel et al. eventually realized such a "microscope" and used it to study the photodetachment of Br^{−}. It was Helm and co-workers, however, who were the first to create an electron imaging apparatus. The instrument is an improvement on previous photoelectron spectrometers in that it provides information on all energies and all angles of the photoelectrons for each shot of the laser. Helm and his co-workers have now used this technique to investigate the ionization of Xe, Ne, H_{2}, and Ar. In more recent examples, Suzuki, Hayden, and Stolow have pioneered the use of femtosecond excitation and ionization to follow excited state dynamics in larger molecules.
