= Legendre transform (integral transform) =

In mathematics, Legendre transform is an integral transform named after the mathematician Adrien-Marie Legendre, which uses Legendre polynomials $P_n(x)$ as kernels of the transform. Legendre transform is a special case of Jacobi transform.

The Legendre transform of a function $f(x)$ is

$$\mathcal{J}_n\{f(x)\} = \tilde f(n) = \int_{-1}^1 P_n(x)\  f(x) \ dx$$

The inverse Legendre transform is given by

$$\mathcal{J}_n^{-1}\{\tilde f(n)\} = f(x) = \sum_{n=0}^\infty \frac{2n+1}{2} \tilde f(n) P_n(x)$$

== Associated Legendre transform ==
Associated Legendre transform is defined as

$$\mathcal{J}_{n,m}\{f(x)\} = \tilde f(n,m) = \int_{-1}^1 (1-x^2)^{-m/2}P_n^m(x) \  f(x) \ dx$$

The inverse Legendre transform is given by

$$\mathcal{J}_{n,m}^{-1}\{\tilde f(n,m)\} = f(x) = \sum_{n=0}^\infty \frac{2n+1}{2}\frac{(n-m)!}{(n+m)!} \tilde f(n,m)(1-x^2)^{m/2} P_n^m(x)$$

== Some Legendre transform pairs ==
$f(x)\,$	$\tilde f(n)\,$
$x^n \,$	$\frac{2^{n+1} (n!)^2}{(2n+1)!}$
$e^{ax} \,$	$\sqrt{\frac{2\pi}{a}}I_{n+1/2}(a)$
$e^{iax} \,$	$\sqrt{\frac{2\pi}{a}}i^n J_{n+1/2}(a)$
$xf(x) \,$	$\frac{1}{2n+1}[(n+1)\tilde f(n+1) + n \tilde f(n-1)]$
$(1-x^2)^{-1/2} \,$	$\pi P_n^2(0)$
$[2(a-x)]^{-1} \,$	$Q_n(a)$
$(1-2ax+a^2)^{-1/2}, \ |a|<1 \,$	$2a^n (2n+1)^{-1}$
$(1-2ax+a^2)^{-3/2}, \ |a|<1 \,$	$2a^n (1-a^2)^{-1}$
$\int_0^a \frac{t^{b-1} \, dt}{(1-2xt + t^2)^{1/2}}, \ |a|<1 \ b>0 \,$	$\frac{2a^{n+b}}{(2n+1)(n+b)}$
$\frac{d}{dx}\left[(1-x^2)\frac{d}{dx} \right] f(x)\,$	$-n(n+1)\tilde f(n)$
$\left\{\frac{d}{dx}\left[(1-x^2)\frac{d}{dx} \right]\right\}^k f(x)\,$	$(-1)^k n^k (n+1)^k \tilde f(n)$
$\frac{f(x)}{4}-\frac{d}{dx}\left[(1-x^2)\frac{d}{dx} \right] f(x)\,$	$\left(n+\frac{1}{2}\right)^2\tilde f(n)$
$\ln(1-x) \,$	$$\begin{cases} 2(\ln 2 -1) , &  n= 0\\ -\frac{2}{n(n+1)} ,   &  n>0 \end{cases}\,$$
$f(x)*g(x)\,$	$\tilde f(n)\tilde g(n)$
$\int_{-1}^x f(t) \, dt \,$	$$\begin{cases} \tilde f(0)-\tilde f(1) , &  n= 0\\ \frac{\tilde f(n-1) - \tilde f(n+1)}{2n+1} ,   &  n>1 \end{cases}\,$$
$\frac{d}{dx} g(x), \ g(x) = \int_{-1}^x f(t) \,dt$	$g(1) - \int_{-1}^1g(x) \frac{d}{dx} P_n(x) \,dx$
