= Linear canonical transformation =

Integral transform

In Hamiltonian mechanics, the linear canonical transformation (LCT) is a family of integral transforms that generalizes many classical transforms. It has 4 parameters and 1 constraint, so it is a 3-dimensional family, and can be visualized as the action of the special linear group SL_{2}(C) on the time–frequency plane (domain). As this defines the original function up to a sign, this translates into an action of its double cover on the original function space.

The LCT generalizes the Fourier, fractional Fourier, Laplace, Gauss–Weierstrass, Bargmann and the Fresnel transforms as particular cases. The name "linear canonical transformation" is from canonical transformation, a map that preserves the symplectic structure, as SL_{2}(R) can also be interpreted as the symplectic group Sp_{2}, and thus LCTs are the linear maps of the time–frequency domain which preserve the symplectic form, and their action on the Hilbert space is given by the Metaplectic group.

The basic properties of the transformations mentioned above, such as scaling, shift, coordinate multiplication are considered. Any linear canonical transformation is related to affine transformations in phase space, defined by time-frequency or position-momentum coordinates.

== Definition ==
The LCT can be represented in several ways; most easily, it can be parameterized by a 2×2 matrix with determinant 1, i.e., an element of the special linear group SL_{2}(C). Then for any such matrix $\bigl(\begin{smallmatrix}a & b\\c & d\end{smallmatrix}\bigr),$ with ad − bc = 1, the corresponding integral transform from a function $x(t)$ to $X(u)$ is defined as

$$X_{(a,b,c,d)}(u) = \begin{cases}
\sqrt{\frac{1}{ib}} \cdot e^{i  \pi \frac{d}{b} u^2} \int_{-\infty}^\infty e^{-i 2 \pi \frac{1}{b} ut}e^{i \pi \frac{a}{b} t^2} x(t) \, dt, & \text{when } b \ne 0, \\
\sqrt{d} \cdot e^{i  \pi cdu^{2}} x(d \cdot u), & \text{when } b = 0.
\end{cases}$$

== Special cases ==
Many classical transforms are special cases of the linear canonical transform:

=== Scaling ===
Scaling, $x(u) \mapsto \sqrt{\sigma} x(\sigma u)$, corresponds to scaling the time and frequency dimensions inversely (as time goes faster, frequencies are higher and the time dimension shrinks):
$$\begin{bmatrix}
1/\sigma & 0 \\
0 & \sigma
\end{bmatrix}$$

=== Fourier transform ===
The Fourier transform corresponds to a clockwise rotation by 90° in the time–frequency plane, represented by the matrix
$$\begin{bmatrix}
a & b \\
c & d
\end{bmatrix}
=
\begin{bmatrix}
0  & 1 \\
-1 & 0
\end{bmatrix}.$$

=== Fractional Fourier transform ===
The fractional Fourier transform corresponds to rotation by an arbitrary angle; they are the elliptic elements of SL_{2}(R), represented by the matrices
$$\begin{bmatrix}
a & b \\
c & d
\end{bmatrix}
=
\begin{bmatrix}
\cos \theta & \sin \theta \\
-\sin \theta & \cos \theta
\end{bmatrix}.$$
The Fourier transform is the fractional Fourier transform when $\theta = 90^\circ.$ The inverse Fourier transform corresponds to $\theta = -90^\circ.$

=== Fresnel transform ===
The Fresnel transform corresponds to shearing, and are a family of parabolic elements, represented by the matrices
$$\begin{bmatrix}
a & b \\
c & d
\end{bmatrix}
=
\begin{bmatrix}
1  & \lambda z \\
0 & 1
\end{bmatrix},$$
where z is distance, and λ is wavelength.

=== Laplace transform ===
The Laplace transform corresponds to rotation by 90° into the complex domain and can be represented by the matrix
$$\begin{bmatrix}
a & b \\
c & d
\end{bmatrix}
=
\begin{bmatrix}
0 & i \\
i & 0
\end{bmatrix}.$$

=== Fractional Laplace transform ===
The fractional Laplace transform corresponds to rotation by an arbitrary angle into the complex domain and can be represented by the matrix
$$\begin{bmatrix}
a & b \\
c & d
\end{bmatrix}
=
\begin{bmatrix}
i \cos \theta & i \sin \theta \\
i \sin \theta & -i \cos \theta
\end{bmatrix}.$$
The Laplace transform is the fractional Laplace transform when $\theta = 90^\circ.$ The inverse Laplace transform corresponds to $\theta = -90^\circ.$

=== Chirp multiplication ===
Chirp multiplication, $x(u) \mapsto e^{i\pi\tau u^2} x(u)$, corresponds to $b = 0, c = \tau$:
$$\begin{bmatrix}
a & b \\
c & d
\end{bmatrix}
=
\begin{bmatrix}
1 & 0 \\
\tau & 1
\end{bmatrix}.$$

== Composition ==
Composition of LCTs corresponds to multiplication of the corresponding matrices; this is also known as the additivity property of the Wigner distribution function (WDF). Occasionally the product of transforms can pick up a sign factor due to picking a different branch of the square root in the definition of the LCT. In the literature, this is called the metaplectic phase.

If the LCT is denoted by $O_F^{(a, b, c, d)}$, i.e.

$$X_{(a,b,c,d)}(u) = O_F^{(a,b,c,d)}[x(t)],$$

then

$$O_F^{(a_2,b_2,c_2,d_2)} \left \{ O_F^{(a_1,b_1,c_1,d_1)}[x(t)] \right \} = O_F^{(a_3,b_3,c_3,d_3)}[x(t)],$$

where

$$\begin{bmatrix}
a_3 & b_3 \\
c_3 & d_3
\end{bmatrix}
=
\begin{bmatrix}
a_2 & b_2 \\
c_2 & d_2
\end{bmatrix}
\begin{bmatrix}
a_1 & b_1 \\
c_1 & d_1
\end{bmatrix}.$$

If $W_{X(a,b,c,d)}(u,v)$ is the $X_{(a,b,c,d)}(u)$, where $X_{(a,b,c,d)}(u)$ is the LCT of $x(t)$, then

$$W_{X(a,b,c,d)}(u,v) = W_{x}(du - bv, -cu + av),$$
$$W_{X(a,b,c,d)}(au + bv, cu + dv) = W_{x}(u,v).$$

LCT is equal to the twisting operation for the WDF and the Cohen's class distribution also has the twisting operation.

We can freely use the LCT to transform the parallelogram whose center is at (0, 0) to another parallelogram which has the same area and the same center:

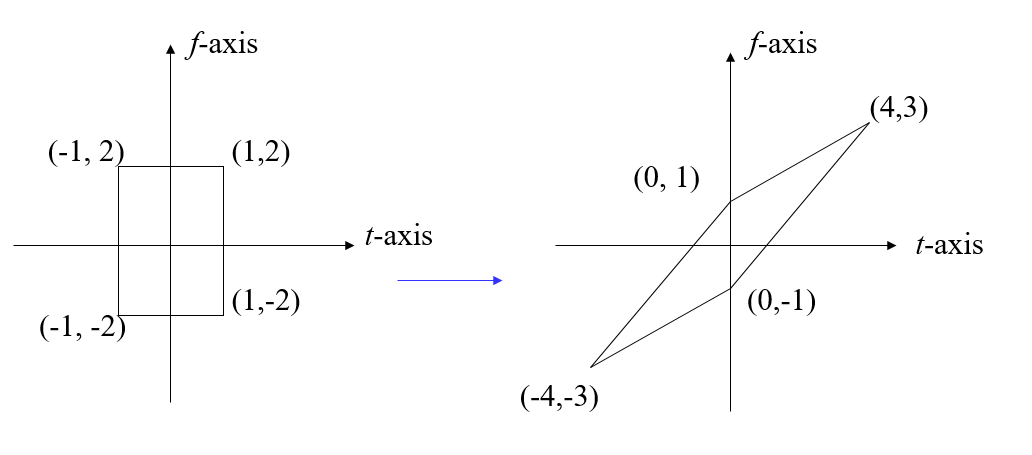

From this picture we know that the point (−1, 2) transform to the point (0, 1), and the point (1, 2) transform to the point (4, 3). As the result, we can write down the equations

$$\begin{cases}
-a + 2b = 0, \\
-c + 2d = 1,
\end{cases}
\qquad
\begin{cases}
a + 2b = 4, \\
c + 2d = 3.
\end{cases}$$

Solve these equations gives (a, b, c, d) = (2, 1, 1, 1).

== In optics and quantum mechanics ==
Paraxial optical systems implemented entirely with thin lenses and propagation through free space and/or graded-index (GRIN) media, are quadratic-phase systems (QPS); these were known before Moshinsky and Quesne (1974) called attention to their significance in connection with canonical transformations in quantum mechanics. The effect of any arbitrary QPS on an input wavefield can be described using the linear canonical transform, a particular case of which was developed by Segal (1963) and Bargmann (1961) in order to formalize Fock's (1928) boson calculus.

In quantum mechanics, linear canonical transformations can be identified with the linear transformations which mix the momentum operator with the position operator and leave invariant the canonical commutation relations.

== Applications ==
Canonical transforms are used to analyze differential equations. These include diffusion, the Schrödinger free particle, the linear potential (free-fall), and the attractive and repulsive oscillator equations. It also includes a few others such as the Fokker–Planck equation. Although this class is far from universal, the ease with which solutions and properties are found makes canonical transforms an attractive tool for problems such as these.

Wave propagation through air, a lens, and between satellite dishes are discussed here. All of the computations can be reduced to 2×2 matrix algebra. This is the spirit of LCT.

=== Electromagnetic wave propagation ===
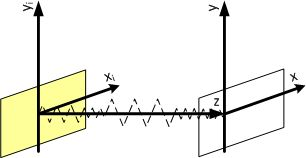

Assuming the system looks like as depicted in the figure, the wave travels from the (x_{i}, y_{i}) plane to the (x, y) plane. The Fresnel transform is used to describe electromagnetic wave propagation in free space:

$$U_0(x, y) = - \frac{j}{\lambda} \frac{e^{jkz}}{z} \int_{-\infty}^\infty \int_{-\infty}^{\infty} e^{j \frac{k}{2z} \left[ (x - x_i)^2 + (y - y_i)^2 \right] } U_i(x_i,y_i) \,dx_i\,dy_i,$$

where

$k = 2\pi / \lambda$ is the wave number,
λ is the wavelength,
z is the distance of propagation,
$j = \sqrt{-1}$ is the imaginary unit.

This is equivalent to LCT (shearing), when

$$\begin{bmatrix}
a & b \\
c & d
\end{bmatrix}
=
\begin{bmatrix}
1 & \lambda z \\
0 & 1
\end{bmatrix}.$$

When the travel distance (z) is larger, the shearing effect is larger.

=== Spherical lens ===
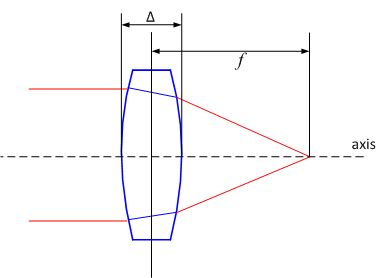

With the lens as depicted in the figure, and the refractive index denoted as n, the result is

$$U_0(x, y) = e^{jkn \Delta} e^{-j \frac{k}{2f} [x^2 + y ^2]} U_i(x, y),$$

where f is the focal length, and Δ is the thickness of the lens.

The distortion passing through the lens is similar to LCT, when

$$\begin{bmatrix}
a & b \\
c & d
\end{bmatrix}
=
\begin{bmatrix}
1 & 0 \\
\frac{-1}{\lambda f} & 1
\end{bmatrix}.$$

This is also a shearing effect: when the focal length is smaller, the shearing effect is larger.

=== Spherical mirror ===
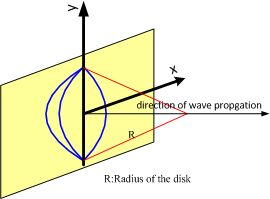

The spherical mirror—e.g., a satellite dish—can be described as a LCT, with

$$\begin{bmatrix}
a & b \\
c & d
\end{bmatrix}
=
\begin{bmatrix}
1 & 0 \\
\frac{-1}{\lambda R} & 1
\end{bmatrix}.$$

This is very similar to lens, except focal length is replaced by the radius R of the dish. A spherical mirror with radius curvature of R is equivalent to a thin lens with the focal length f = −R/2 (by convention, R < 0 for concave mirror, R > 0 for convex mirror). Therefore, if the radius is smaller, the shearing effect is larger.

=== Joint free space and spherical lens ===
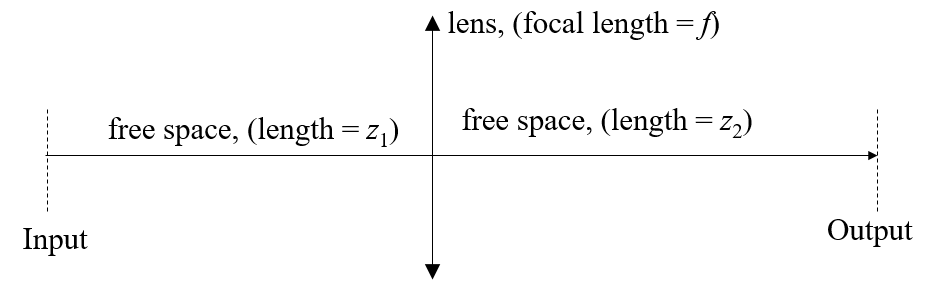

The relation between the input and output we can use LCT to represent

$$\begin{bmatrix} a & b \\ c & d \end{bmatrix}=\begin{bmatrix} 1 & \lambda z_2 \\ 0 & 1 \end{bmatrix}
\begin{bmatrix} 1 & 0 \\  -1/\lambda f & 1\end{bmatrix} \begin{bmatrix} 1 & \lambda z_1 \\ 0 & 1 \end{bmatrix}= \begin{bmatrix} 1-z_2/f & \lambda (z_1+z_2)-\lambda z_1z_2/f\\ -1/\lambda f & 1-z_1/f \end{bmatrix}\, .$$

1. If $z_1 = z_2 = 2f$, it is reverse real image.
2. If $z_1 = z_2 = f$, it is Fourier transform+scaling
3. If $z_1 = z_2$, it is fractional Fourier transform+scaling

== Basic properties ==
In this part, we show the basic properties of LCT

Operator	Matrix of transform
$L(T)$	$$\begin{bmatrix} a & b \\ c & d \end{bmatrix}$$
$L(T_1)L(T_2)$	$T_2T_1$
$L^{-1}(T) = L(T^{-1})$	$$\begin{bmatrix} d^t & -b^t \\ -c^t & a^t \end{bmatrix}$$
$L(\widehat{T}) = L^*(T^{-1})$	$$\begin{bmatrix} d^t & b^t \\ c^t & a^t \end{bmatrix}$$
$F$	$$\begin{bmatrix} 0 & I \\ -I & 0 \end{bmatrix}$$
$$\begin{cases} FL(T)F^{-1} = L^*(T^{t-1}) \\ F^{-1}L(T)F = L^*(T^{t-1}) \end{cases}$$	$$\begin{bmatrix} d & -c \\ -b & a \end{bmatrix}$$

Given a two-dimensional column vector
$$r = \begin{bmatrix} x \\ y \end{bmatrix},$$
we show some basic properties (result) for the specific input below:

Input	Output	Remark
$f_i(r)$	$f_o(r) = L(T){\displaystyle f_{i}(r)},$ where $$T = \begin{bmatrix} a & b \\ c & d \end{bmatrix}$$	
$\sum_{n}a_n f_n(r)$	$\sum_{n}a_n Lf_n(r)$	linearity
$f_i(r), h_i(r)$	$\int f_i(r) h^*_i(r)\,dr = \int f_o(r) h^*_o(r)\,dr$	Parseval's theorem
$f_i^*(r)$	$[L(T^{-1}) f_i(r)]^*,$ where $$T^{-1} = \begin{bmatrix} d^t & -b^t \\ -c^t & a^t \end{bmatrix}$$	complex conjugate
$\Mu^n f_i(r)$	$(d^t \Mu - b^t D)^n f_o(r), \quad \Mu = r$	multiplication
$D^n f_i(r)$	$(-c^t \Mu - a^t D)^n f_o(r), \quad D = (i2\pi)^{-1} \nabla^t$	derivation
$f_i(r) e^{i2\pi k^tr}$	$f_o(r - bk) e^{i2\pi k^t d^t r} e^{-i\pi k^t b^t dk}$	modulation
$f_i(r-k)$	$f_o(r)e^{i2\pi k^tc^tr}e^{-i\pi k^tc^tak}$	shift
$|\det(W)|^{-1/2}f_i(W^{-1}r)$	$L(\tilde{T})f_i(r),$ where $$\tilde{T}=T\begin{bmatrix} W & 0 \\ 0 & W^{t-1} \end{bmatrix}$$	scaling
$f_i(-r)$	$L(-T)f_i(r)=f_o(-r)$	scaling
1	$(\det(A))^{-1/2}e^{i\pi r^tCA^{-1}r}$	
$e^{i\pi r^tL_ir}$	$[\det(A+iL_i)]^{-1/2}e^{-\pi r^tL_or},$ where $\,iL_o=(C+iDL_i)(A+iBL_i)^{-1}$	
$e^{i2\pi k^tr}$	$(\det(A))^{-1/2}e^{i\pi r^tCA^{-1}r}*e^{-i\pi k^tA^{-1}BK}e^{i2\pi k^tCA^{-1}r}$	

== Example ==
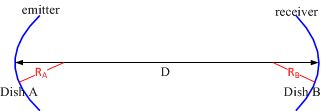

The system considered is depicted in the figure to the right: two dishes – one being the emitter and the other one the receiver – and a signal travelling between them over a distance D. First, for dish A (emitter), the LCT matrix looks like this:

$$\begin{bmatrix}
1 & 0 \\
\frac{-1}{\lambda R_A} & 1
\end{bmatrix}.$$

Then, for dish B (receiver), the LCT matrix similarly becomes:

$$\begin{bmatrix}
1 & 0 \\
\frac{-1}{\lambda R_B} & 1
\end{bmatrix}.$$

Last, for the propagation of the signal in air, the LCT matrix is:

$$\begin{bmatrix}
1 & \lambda D \\
0 & 1
\end{bmatrix}.$$

Putting all three components together, the LCT of the system is:

$$\begin{bmatrix}
a & b \\
c & d
\end{bmatrix}
=
\begin{bmatrix}
1 & 0 \\
\frac{-1}{\lambda R_B} & 1
\end{bmatrix}
\begin{bmatrix}
1 & \lambda D \\
0 & 1
\end{bmatrix}
\begin{bmatrix}
1 & 0 \\
\frac{-1}{\lambda R_A} & 1
\end{bmatrix}
=
\begin{bmatrix}
1-\frac{D}{R_A} & - \lambda D \\
\frac{1}{\lambda} (R_A^{-1} + R_B^{-1} - R_A^{-1}R_B^{-1}D)  & 1 - \frac{D}{R_B}
\end{bmatrix}
\, .$$

== See also ==
- Segal–Shale–Weil distribution, a metaplectic group of operators related to the chirplet transform
- Other time–frequency transforms:
  - Fractional Fourier transform
  - Continuous Fourier transform
  - Chirplet transform
- Applications:
  - Focus recovery based on the linear canonical transform
  - Ray transfer matrix analysis
