= Sumudu transform =

Integral transform introduced in 1990

The Sumudu transform is an integral transform introduced in 1990 by G K Watagala. It is defined over the set of functions

$$A = \{f(t) : \ni M, p ,q> 0 , |f(t)|\leq M \exp(1/u) \}$$

where $p \leq u \leq q$, the Sumudu transform is defined as

$$S[f(t)]= \frac 1 u \int_0^\infty f(t) \exp\left(-\frac tu\right) \, dt$$

== Relationship with other transforms ==
Sumudu transform is related to Laplace transform by the following relation: $S[f(t)](u)=\frac{1}{u} L[f(t)](\frac{1}{u})$; and to Elzaki transform by the following relation: $u^2S[f(t)](u)= E[f(t)](u)$.
