= Photoelectron photoion coincidence spectroscopy =

Photoionization mass spectrometry combined with photoelectron spectroscopy

Photoelectron photoion coincidence spectroscopy (PEPICO) is a combination of photoionization mass spectrometry and photoelectron spectroscopy. It is largely based on the photoelectric effect. Free molecules from a gas-phase sample are ionized by incident vacuum ultraviolet (VUV) radiation. In the ensuing photoionization, a cation and a photoelectron are formed for each sample molecule. The mass of the photoion is determined by time-of-flight mass spectrometry, whereas, in current setups, photoelectrons are typically detected by velocity map imaging. Electron times-of-flight are three orders of magnitude smaller than those of ions, which allows electron detection to be used as a time stamp for the ionization event, starting the clock for the ion time-of-flight analysis. In contrast with pulsed experiments, such as REMPI, in which the light pulse must act as the time stamp, this allows the use of continuous light sources, e.g. a discharge lamp or a synchrotron light source. No more than several ion–electron pairs are present simultaneously in the instrument, and the electron–ion pairs belonging to a single photoionization event can be identified and detected in delayed coincidence.

== History ==
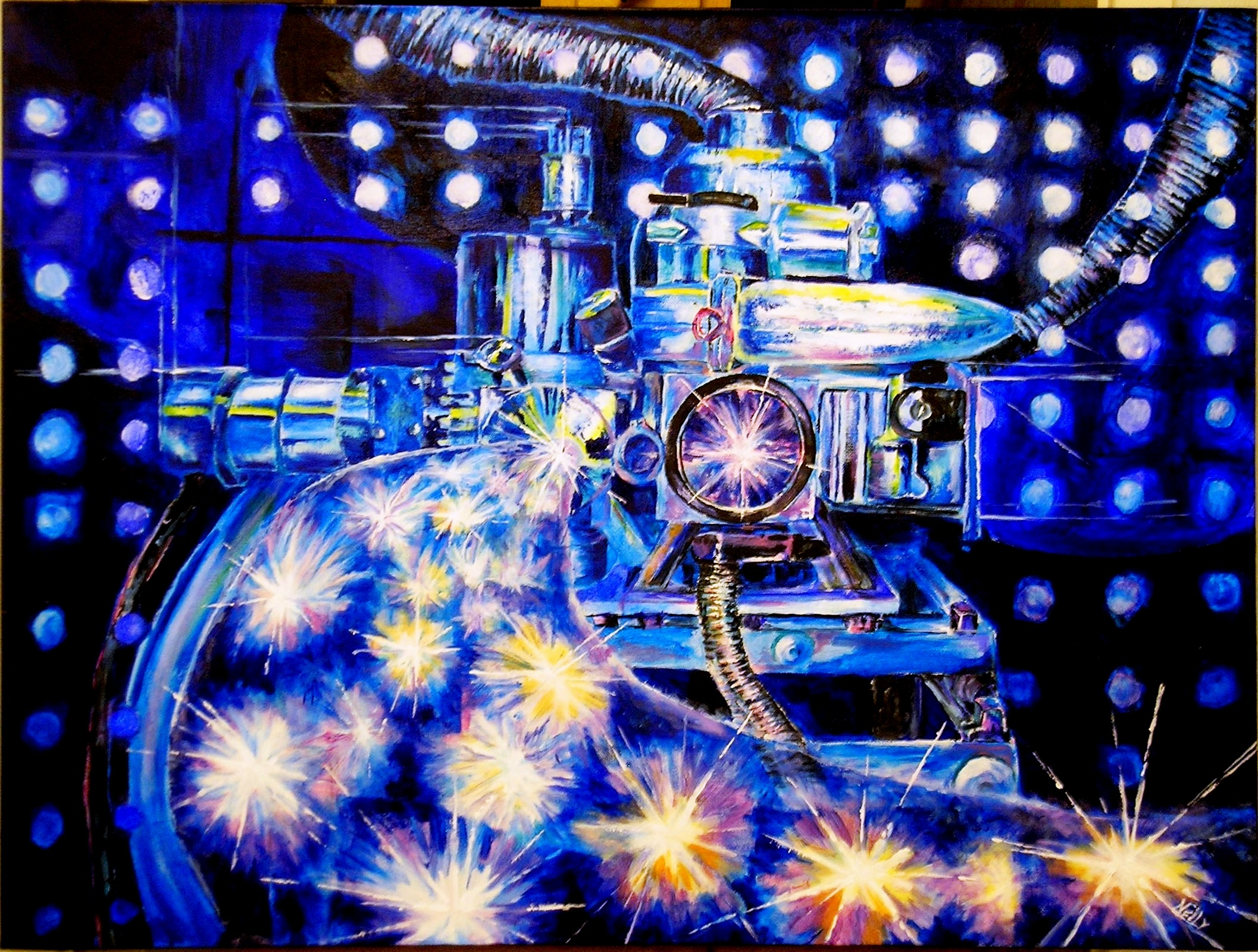
A painting featuring the PEPICO endstation at the Swiss Light Source.

Brehm and von Puttkammer published the first PEPICO study on methane in 1967. In the early works, a fixed energy light source was used, and the electron detection was carried out using retarding grids or hemispherical analyzers: the mass spectra were recorded as a function of electron energy. Tunable vacuum ultraviolet light sources were used in later setups, in which fixed, mostly zero kinetic energy electrons were detected, and the mass spectra were recorded as a function of photon energy. Detecting zero kinetic energy or threshold electrons in threshold photoelectron photoion coincidence spectroscopy, TPEPICO, has two major advantages. Firstly, no kinetic energy electrons are produced in energy ranges with poor Franck–Condon factors in the photoelectron spectrum, but threshold electrons can still be emitted via other ionization mechanisms. Secondly, threshold electrons are stationary and can be detected with higher collection efficiencies, thereby increasing signal levels.

Threshold electron detection was first based on line-of-sight, i.e. a small positive field was applied towards the electron detector, and kinetic energy electrons with perpendicular velocities are stopped by small apertures. The inherent compromise between resolution and collection efficiency was resolved by applying velocity map imaging conditions. Most recent setups offer meV or better (0.1 kJ mol^{−1}) resolution both in terms of photon energy and electron kinetic energy.

The 5–20 eV (500–2000 kJ mol^{−1}, λ = 250–60 nm) energy range is of prime interest in valence photoionization. Widely tunable light sources are few and far between in this energy range. The only laboratory based one is the H_{2} discharge lamp, which delivers quasi-continuous radiation up to 14 eV. The few high resolution laser setups for this energy range are not easily tunable over several eV. Currently, VUV beamlines at third generation synchrotron light sources are the brightest and most tunable photon sources for valence ionization. The first high energy resolution PEPICO experiment at a synchrotron was the pulsed-field ionization setup at the Chemical Dynamics Beamline of the Advanced Light Source.

== Overview ==
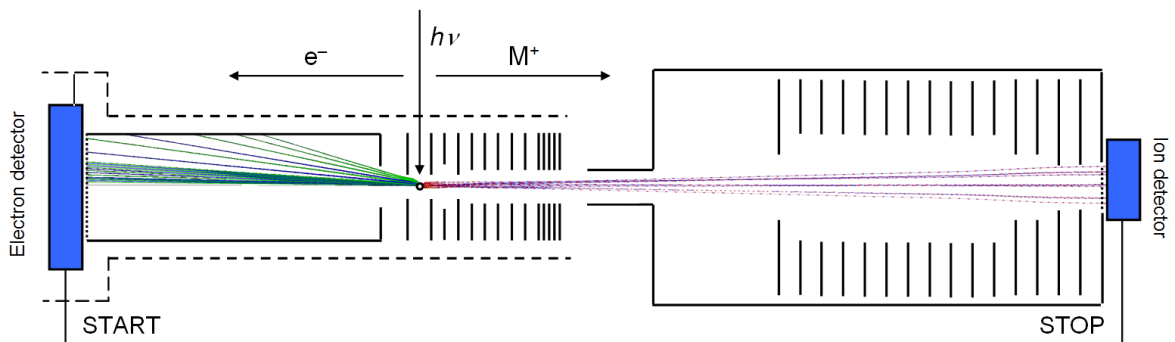
Velocity map imaging photoelectron photoion coincidence apparatus. Electrons with different kinetic energies are shown as well as ions with a room temperature kinetic energy distribution.

The primary application of TPEPICO is the production of internal energy selected ions to study their unimolecular dissociation dynamics as a function of internal energy. The electrons are extracted by a continuous electric field and are velocity map imaged depending on their initial kinetic energy. Ions are accelerated in the opposite direction and their mass is determined by time-of-flight mass spectrometry. The data analysis yields dissociation thresholds, which can be used to derive new thermochemistry for the sample.

The electron imager side can also be used to record photoionization cross sections, photoelectron energy and angular distributions. With the help of circularly polarized light, photoelectron circular dichroism (PECD) can be studied. A thorough understanding of PECD effects could help explain the homochirality of life. Flash pyrolysis can also be used to produce free radicals or intermediates, which are then characterized to complement e.g. combustion studies. In such cases, the photoion mass analysis is used to confirm the identity of the radical produced.

Photoelectron photoion coincidence spectroscopy can be used to shed light on reaction mechanisms, and can also be generalized to study double ionization in (photoelectron) photoion photoion coincidence ((PE)PIPICO), fluorescence using photoelectron photon coincidence (PEFCO), or photoelectron photoelectron coincidence (PEPECO). Times-of-flight of photoelectrons and photoions can be combined in a form of a map, which visualizes the dynamics of the dissociative ionization process. Ion–electron velocity vector correlation functions can be obtained in double imaging setups, in which the ion detector also delivers position information.

== Energy selection ==
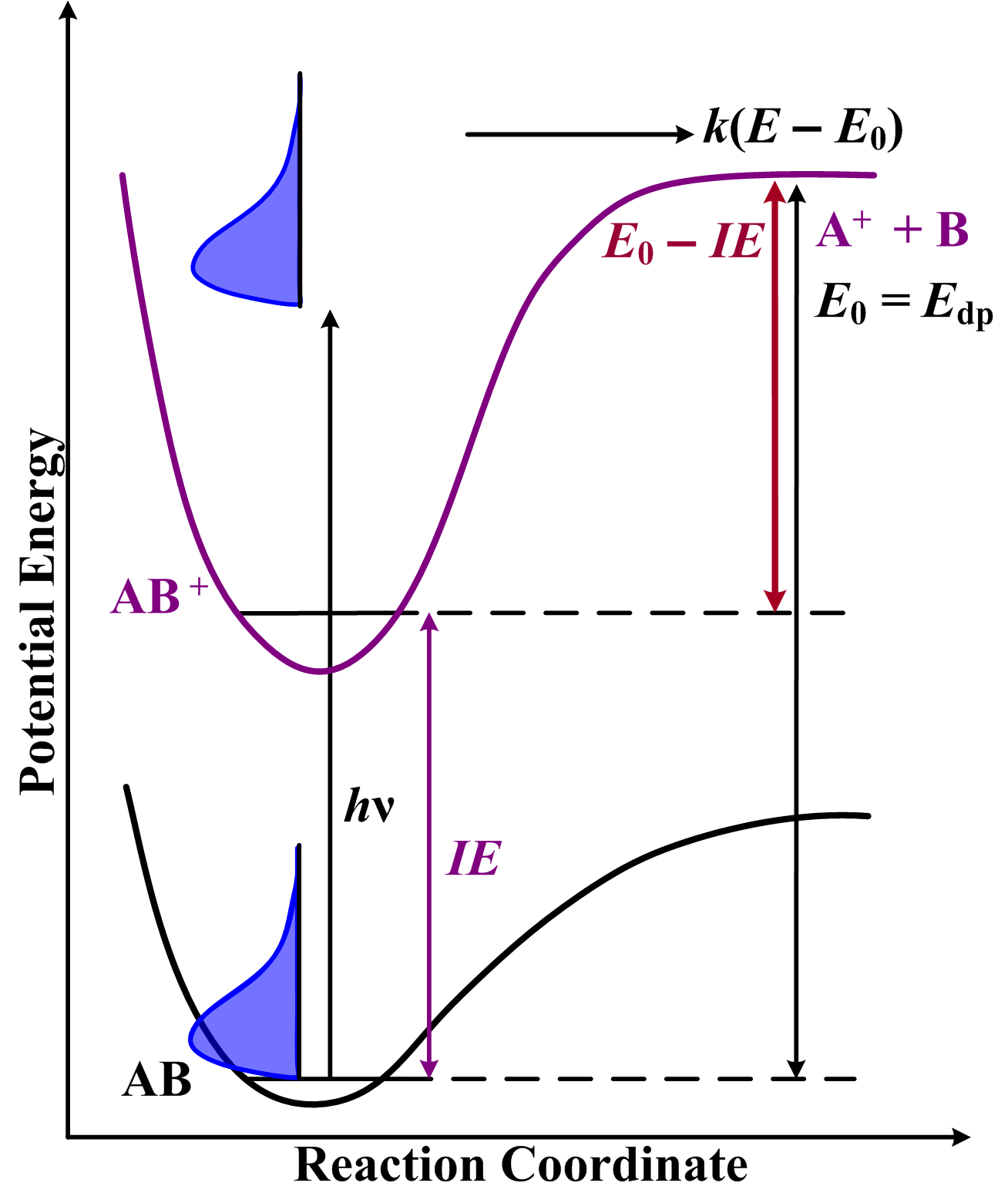
Potential energy diagram for dissociative photoionization. When only zero kinetic energy electrons are detected, the photon energy above the adiabatic ionization energy is converted into the internal energy of the photoion AB^{+}

The relatively low intensity of the ionizing VUV radiation guarantees one-photon processes, in other words only one, fixed energy photon will be responsible for photoionization. The energy balance of photoionization comprises the internal energy and the adiabatic ionization energy of the neutral as well as the photon energy, the kinetic energy of the photoelectron and of the photoion. Because only threshold electrons are considered and the conservation of momentum holds, the last two terms vanish, and the internal energy of the photoion is known:

$$E_{\text{int}}^{\text{ion}} = E_{\text{int}}^{\text{neutral}} + h \nu - IE_{\text{ad}}$$

Scanning the photon energy corresponds to shifting the internal energy distribution of the parent ion. The parent ion sits in a potential energy well, in which the lowest energy exit channel often corresponds to the breaking of the weakest chemical bond, resulting in the formation of a fragment or daughter ion. A mass spectrum is recorded at every photon energy, and the fractional ion abundances are plotted to obtain the breakdown diagram. At low energies no parent ion is energetic enough to dissociate, and the parent ion corresponds to 100% of the ion signal. As the photon energy is increased, a certain fraction of the parent ions (in fact according to the cumulative distribution function of the neutral internal energy distribution) still has too little energy to dissociate, but some do. The parent ion fractional abundances decrease, and the daughter ion signal increases. At the dissociative photoionization threshold, E_{0}, all parent ions, even the ones with initially 0 internal energy, can dissociate, and the daughter ion abundance reaches 100% in the breakdown diagram.

If the potential energy well of the parent ion is shallow and the complete initial thermal energy distribution is broader than the depth of the well, the breakdown diagram can also be used to determine adiabatic ionization energies.

== Data analysis ==
The data analysis becomes more demanding if there are competing parallel dissociation channels or if the dissociation at threshold is too slow to be observed on the time scale (several μs) of the experiment. In the first case, the slower dissociation channel will appear only at higher energies, an effect called competitive shift, whereas in the second, the resulting kinetic shift means that the fragmentation will only be observed at some excess energy, i.e. only when it is fast enough to take place on the experimental time scale. When several dissociation steps follow sequentially, the second step typically occurs at high excess energies: the system has much more internal energy than needed for breaking the weakest bond in the parent ion. Some of this excess energy is retained as internal energy of the fragment ion, some may be converted into the internal energy of the leaving neutral fragment (invisible to mass spectrometry) and the rest is released as kinetic energy, in that the fragments fly apart at some non-zero velocity.

More often than not, dissociative photoionization processes can be described within a statistical framework, similarly to the approach used in collision-induced dissociation experiments. If the ergodic hypothesis holds, the system will explore each region of the phase space with a probability according to its volume. A transition state (TS) can then be defined in the phase space, which connects the dissociating ion with the dissociation products, and the dissociation rates for the slow or competing dissociations can be expressed in terms of the TS phase space volume vs. the total phase space volume. The total phase space volume is calculated in a microcanonical ensemble using the known energy and the density of states of the dissociating ion. There are several approaches how to define the transition state, the most widely used being RRKM theory. The unimolecular dissociation rate curve as a function of energy, k(E), vanishes below the dissociative photoionization energy, E_{0}.

Statistical theory can also be used in the microcanonical formalism to describe the excess energy partitioning in sequential dissociation steps, as proposed by Klots for a canonical ensemble. Such a statistical approach was used for more than a hundred systems to determine accurate dissociative photoionization onsets, and derive thermochemical information from them.

Furthermore, algorithms based on probabilistic Bayesian analyses are known to considerably reduce systematic biases induced by false coincidences. The intensity of these false coincidences can big strong enough to appear as a separate peaks in the signal and complicate the analysis of the spectra.

== Thermochemical applications ==
Dissociative photoionization processes can be generalized as:

AB + hν → A^{+} + B + e^{−}

If the enthalpies of formation of two of the three species are known, the third can be calculated with the help of the dissociative photoionization energy, E_{0}, using Hess's law. This approach was used, for instance, to determine the enthalpy of formation of the methyl ion, CH_{3}^{+}, which in turn was used to obtain the enthalpy of formation of iodomethane, CH_{3}I as 15.23 kJ mol^{−1}, with an uncertainty of only 0.3 kJ mol^{−1}.

If different sample molecules produce shared fragment ions, a complete thermochemical chain can be constructed, as was shown for some methyl trihalides, where the uncertainty in e.g. the CHCl_{2}Br, (Halon-1021) heat of formation was reduced from 20 to 2 kJ mol^{−1}. Furthermore, dissociative photoionization energies can be combined with calculated isodesmic reaction energies to build thermochemical networks. Such an approach was used to revise primary alkylamine enthalpies of formation.

== See also ==
- Covariance mapping
- Photoelectric effect
