= Laguerre transform =

In mathematics, Laguerre transform is an integral transform named after the mathematician Edmond Laguerre, which uses generalized Laguerre polynomials $L_n^\alpha(x)$ as kernels of the transform.

The Laguerre transform of a function $f(x)$ is

$$L\{f(x)\} = \tilde f_\alpha(n) = \int_{0}^\infty e^{-x} x^\alpha \ L_n^\alpha(x)\  f(x) \ dx$$

The inverse Laguerre transform is given by

$$L^{-1}\{\tilde f_\alpha(n)\} = f(x) = \sum_{n=0}^\infty \binom{n+\alpha}{n}^{-1} \frac{1}{\Gamma(\alpha+1)} \tilde f_\alpha(n) L_n^\alpha(x)$$

== Some Laguerre transform pairs ==
$f(x)\,$	$\tilde f_\alpha(n)\,$
$x^{a-1}, \ a>0\,$	$\frac{\Gamma(a+\alpha)\Gamma(n-a+1)}{n!\Gamma(1-a)}$
$e^{-ax}, \ a>-1\,$	$\frac{\Gamma(n+\alpha+1)a^n}{n!(a+1)^{n+\alpha+1}}$
$\sin ax, \ a>0, \ \alpha=0\,$	$\frac{a^n}{(1+a^2)^{\frac{n+1}{2}}} \sin \left[n\tan^{-1} \frac{1}{a} +\tan^{-1} (-a)\right]$
$\cos ax, \ a>0,\ \alpha=0\,$	$\frac{a^n}{(1+a^2)^{\frac{n+1}{2}}} \cos \left[n\tan^{-1} \frac{1}{a} +\tan^{-1} (-a)\right]$
$L_m^\alpha(x)\,$	$\binom{n+\alpha}{n} \Gamma(\alpha+1)\delta_{mn}$
$e^{-ax}L_m^\alpha(x)\,$	$\frac{\Gamma(n+\alpha+1)\Gamma(m+\alpha+1)}{n!m!\Gamma(\alpha+1)}\frac{(a-1)^{n-m+\alpha+1}}{a^{n+m+2\alpha+2}}{}_2F_1\left(n+\alpha+1;\frac{m+\alpha+1}{\alpha+1};\frac{1}{a^2}\right)$
$f(x) x^{\beta-\alpha}\,$	$\sum_{m=0}^n (m!)^{-1}(\alpha-\beta)_m L_{n-m}^\beta(x)$
$e^x x^{-\alpha}\Gamma(\alpha,x)\,$	$\sum_{n=0}^\infty \binom{n+\alpha}{n} \frac{\Gamma(\alpha+1)}{n+1}$
$x^\beta,\ \beta>0\,$	$\Gamma(\alpha+\beta+1)\sum_{n=0}^\infty \binom{n+\alpha}{n} (-\beta)_n\frac{\Gamma(\alpha+1)}{\Gamma(n+\alpha+1)}$
$(1-z)^{-(\alpha+1)}\exp\left(\frac{xz}{z-1}\right),\ |z|<1, \ \alpha\geq 0\,$	$\sum_{n=0}^\infty \binom{n+\alpha}{n}\Gamma(\alpha+1)z^n$
$(xz)^{-\alpha/2}e^z J_\alpha\left[2(xz)^{1/2}\right],\ |z|<1, \ \alpha\geq 0\,$	$\sum_{n=0}^\infty \binom{n+\alpha}{n}\frac{\Gamma(\alpha+1)}{\Gamma(n+\alpha+1)}z^n$
$\frac{d}{dx}f(x)\,$	$\tilde f_\alpha(n) - \alpha\sum_{k=0}^n \tilde f_{\alpha-1}(k) + \sum_{k=0}^{n-1}\tilde f_\alpha(k)$
$x\frac{d}{dx}f(x), \alpha=0\,$	$-(n+1) \tilde f_0(n+1) + n\tilde f_0(n)$
$\int_0^xf(t)dt, \ \alpha=0\,$	$\tilde f_0(n) - \tilde f_0(n-1)$
$e^xx^{-\alpha}\frac{d}{dx}\left[e^{-x}x^{\alpha+1}\frac{d}{dx}\right]f(x)\,$	$-n\tilde f_\alpha(n)$
$\left\{e^xx^{-\alpha}\frac{d}{dx}\left[e^{-x}x^{\alpha+1}\frac{d}{dx}\right]\right\}^kf(x)\,$	$(-1)^kn^k\tilde f_\alpha(n)$
$L_n^\alpha(x), \alpha>-1\,$	$\frac{\Gamma(n+\alpha+1)}{n!}$
$xL_n^\alpha(x), \alpha>-1\,$	$\frac{\Gamma(n+\alpha+1)}{n!}(2n+1+\alpha)$
$\frac{1}{\pi} \int_0^\infty e^{-t} f(t) dt \int_0^\pi e^{\sqrt{xt}\cos\theta} \cos(\sqrt{xt}\sin\theta)g(x+t-2\sqrt{xt}\cos\theta)d\theta, \alpha=0\,$	$\tilde f_0(n) \tilde g_0(n)$
$\frac{\Gamma(n+\alpha+1)}{\sqrt\pi\Gamma(n+1)} \int_0^\infty e^{-t}t^\alpha f(t) dt \int_0^\pi e^{-\sqrt{xt}\cos\theta} \sin^{2\alpha}\theta g(x+t+2\sqrt{xt}\cos\theta)\frac{J_{\alpha-1/2}(\sqrt{xt}\sin\theta)}{[(\sqrt{xt}\sin\theta)/2]^{\alpha-1/2}}d\theta\,$	$\tilde f_\alpha(n) \tilde g_\alpha(n)$
