= Abel transform =

Integral transform used in various branches of mathematics

In mathematics, the Abel transform, named for Niels Henrik Abel, is an integral transform often used in the analysis of spherically symmetric or axially symmetric functions. The Abel transform of a function f(r) is given by

$$F(y) = 2 \int_y^\infty \frac{f(r)r}{\sqrt{r^2 - y^2}} \,dr.$$

Assuming that f(r) drops to zero more quickly than 1/r, the inverse Abel transform is given by

$$f(r) = -\frac{1}{\pi} \int_r^\infty \frac{dF}{dy} \,\frac{dy}{\sqrt{y^2 - r^2}}.$$

In image analysis, the forward Abel transform is used to project an optically thin, axially symmetric emission function onto a plane, and the inverse Abel transform is used to calculate the emission function given a projection (i.e. a scan or a photograph) of that emission function.

In absorption spectroscopy of cylindrical flames or plumes, the forward Abel transform is the integrated absorbance along a ray with closest distance y from the center of the flame, while the inverse Abel transform gives the local absorption coefficient at a distance r from the center. Abel transform is limited to applications with axially symmetric geometries. For more general asymmetrical cases, more general-oriented reconstruction algorithms such as algebraic reconstruction technique (ART), maximum likelihood expectation maximization (MLEM), filtered back-projection (FBP) algorithms should be employed.

In recent years, the inverse Abel transform (and its variants) has become the cornerstone of data analysis in photofragment-ion imaging and photoelectron imaging. Among recent most notable extensions of inverse Abel transform are the "onion peeling" and "basis set expansion" (BASEX) methods of photoelectron and photoion image analysis.

== Geometrical interpretation ==
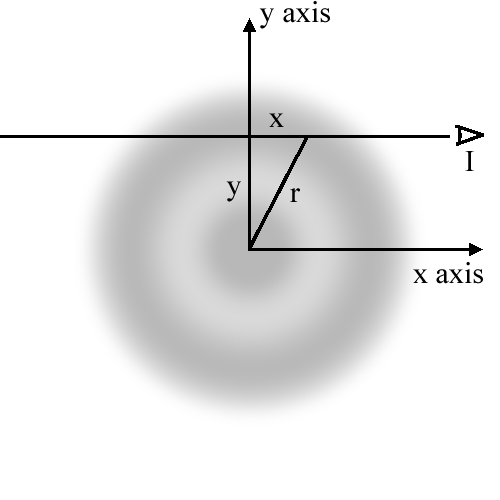
A geometrical interpretation of the Abel transform in two dimensions. An observer (I) looks along a line parallel to the x axis a distance y above the origin. What the observer sees is the projection (i.e. the integral) of the circularly symmetric function f(r) along the line of sight. The function f(r) is represented in gray in this figure. The observer is assumed to be located infinitely far from the origin so that the limits of integration are ±∞.

In two dimensions, the Abel transform F(y) can be interpreted as the projection of a circularly symmetric function f(r) along a set of parallel lines of sight at a distance y from the origin. Referring to the figure on the right, the observer (I) will see

$$F(y) = \int_{-\infty}^\infty f\left(\sqrt{x^2 + y^2}\right) \,dx,$$

where f(r) is the circularly symmetric function represented by the gray color in the figure. It is assumed that the observer is actually at x = ∞, so that the limits of integration are ±∞, and all lines of sight are parallel to the x axis. Realizing that the radius r is related to x and y as r^{2} = x^{2} + y^{2}, it follows that

$$dx = \frac{r\,dr}{\sqrt{r^2 - y^2}}$$

for x > 0. Since f(r) is an even function in x, we may write

$$F(y) = 2 \int_0^\infty f\left(\sqrt{x^2 + y^2}\right) \,dx =  2 \int_{|y|}^\infty f(r)\,\frac{r\,dr}{\sqrt{r^2 - y^2}},$$

which yields the Abel transform of f(r).

The Abel transform may be extended to higher dimensions. Of particular interest is the extension to three dimensions. If we have an axially symmetric function f(ρ, z), where ρ^{2} = x^{2} + y^{2} is the cylindrical radius, then we may want to know the projection of that function onto a plane parallel to the z axis. Without loss of generality, we can take that plane to be the yz plane, so that

$$F(y, z) = \int_{-\infty}^\infty f(\rho, z) \,dx = 2 \int_y^\infty \frac{f(\rho, z) \rho \,d\rho}{\sqrt{\rho^2 - y^2}},$$

which is just the Abel transform of f(ρ, z) in ρ and y.

A particular type of axial symmetry is spherical symmetry. In this case, we have a function f(r), where r^{2} = x^{2} + y^{2} + z^{2}. The projection onto, say, the yz plane will then be circularly symmetric and expressible as F(s), where s^{2} = y^{2} + z^{2}. Carrying out the integration, we have

$$F(s) = \int_{-\infty}^\infty f(r) \,dx = 2 \int_s^\infty \frac{f(r) r \,dr}{\sqrt{r^2 - s^2}},$$

which is again, the Abel transform of f(r) in r and s.

== Verification of the inverse Abel transform ==
Assuming f is continuously differentiable, and f, f′ drop to zero faster than 1/r, we can integrate by parts by setting

$$u=f(r) ,\quad v' = \frac{r}\sqrt{r^2-y^2},$$

to find

$$F(y) = -2 \int_y^\infty f'(r) \sqrt{r^2-y^2} \, dr.$$

Differentiating formally,

$$F'(y) = 2 y \int_y^\infty \frac{f'(r)}{\sqrt{r^2-y^2}} \, dr.$$

Now substitute this into the inverse Abel transform formula:

$$-\frac{1}{\pi} \int_r^\infty \frac{F'(y)}{\sqrt{y^2-r^2}} \, dy = \int_r^\infty \int_y^\infty \frac{-2 y}{\pi \sqrt{\left(y^2-r^2\right) \left(s^2-y^2\right)}} f'(s) \, ds dy.$$

By Fubini's theorem, the last integral equals

$$\int_r^\infty \int_r^s \frac{-2 y}{\pi \sqrt{\left(y^2-r^2\right) \left(s^2-y^2\right)}} \, dy f'(s) \,ds = \int_r^\infty (-1) f'(s) \, ds = f(r).$$

== Generalization of the Abel transform to discontinuous F(y) ==
Consider the case where F(y) is discontinuous at y = y_{Δ}, where it abruptly changes its value by a finite amount ΔF. That is, y_{Δ} and ΔF are defined by

$$\Delta F \equiv \lim_{\varepsilon\rightarrow 0} \bigl( F(y_\Delta-\varepsilon) - F(y_\Delta+\varepsilon) \bigr).$$

Such a situation is encountered in tethered polymers (Polymer brush) exhibiting a vertical phase separation, where F(y) stands for the polymer density profile and $f(r)$ is related to the spatial distribution of terminal, non-tethered monomers of the polymers.

The Abel transform of a function f(r) is under these circumstances again given by:

$$F(y)=2\int_y^\infty \frac{f(r)r\,dr}{\sqrt{r^2-y^2}}.$$

Assuming f(r) drops to zero more quickly than 1/r, the inverse Abel transform is however given by

$$f(r)=\left( \frac{1}{2}\delta\left(r-y_\Delta\right)\sqrt{1-\left(\frac{y_\Delta}{r}\right)^2} - \frac{1}{\pi} \frac{H\left(y_\Delta-r\right)}{\sqrt{y_\Delta^2-r^2}} \right) \Delta F-\frac{1}{\pi}\int_r^\infty\frac{d F}{dy}\frac{dy}{\sqrt{y^2-r^2}}.$$

where δ is the Dirac delta function and H(x) the Heaviside step function. The extended version of the Abel transform for discontinuous F is proven upon applying the Abel transform to shifted, continuous F(y), and it reduces to the classical Abel transform when ΔF = 0. If F(y) has more than a single discontinuity, one has to introduce shifts for any of them to come up with a generalized version of the inverse Abel transform which contains n additional terms, each of them corresponding to one of the n discontinuities.

== Relationship to other integral transforms ==
=== Relationship to the Fourier and Hankel transforms ===
The Abel transform is one member of the FHA cycle of integral operators. For example, in two dimensions, if we define A as the Abel transform operator, F as the Fourier transform operator and H as the zeroth-order Hankel transform operator, then the special case of the projection-slice theorem for circularly symmetric functions states that

$$FA = H.$$

In other words, applying the Abel transform to a one-dimensional function and then applying the Fourier transform to that result is the same as applying the Hankel transform to that function. This concept can be extended to higher dimensions.

=== Relationship to the Radon transform ===
Abel transform can be viewed as the Radon transform of an isotropic 2D function f(r). As f(r) is isotropic, its Radon transform is the same at different angles of the viewing axis. Thus, the Abel transform is a function of the distance along the viewing axis only.

== See also ==
- GPS radio occultation
