= Jacobi transform =

In mathematics, the Jacobi transform is an integral transform named after the mathematician Carl Gustav Jacob Jacobi, which uses Jacobi polynomials $P_n^{\alpha,\beta}(x)$ as kernels of the transform .

The Jacobi transform of a function $F(x)$ is

$$J\{F(x)\} = f^{\alpha,\beta}(n) = \int_{-1}^1 (1-x)^\alpha\  (1+x)^\beta \ P_n^{\alpha,\beta}(x)\  F(x) \ dx$$

The inverse Jacobi transform is given by

$$J^{-1}\{f^{\alpha,\beta}(n)\} = F(x) = \sum_{n=0}^\infty \frac{1}{\delta_n} f^{\alpha,\beta}(n) P_n^{\alpha,\beta}(x), \quad \text{where}
\quad \delta_n =\frac{2^{\alpha+\beta+1} \Gamma(n+ \alpha+1) \Gamma(n+\beta+1)}{n! (\alpha+\beta+2n+1) \Gamma(n+ \alpha+\beta+1)}$$

== Some Jacobi transform pairs ==
Some Jacobi transform pairs
| $F(x)\,$ | $f^{\alpha,\beta}(n)\,$ |
|---|---|
| $x^m, \ m<n \,$ | $0$ |
| $x^n \,$ | $n!(\alpha+\beta+2n+1)\delta_n$ |
| $P_m^{\alpha,\beta}(x) \,$ | $\delta_n \delta_{m, n}$ |
| $(1+x)^{a-\beta} \,$ | $\binom{n+\alpha}{n} 2^{\alpha+a+1} \frac{\Gamma(a+1)\Gamma(\alpha+1)\Gamma(a-\beta+1)}{\Gamma(\alpha+a+n+2)\Gamma(a-\beta+n+1)}$ |
| $(1-x)^{\sigma-\alpha}, \ \Re \sigma>-1 \,$ | $\frac{2^{\sigma+\beta+1}}{n!\Gamma(\alpha-\sigma)}\frac{\Gamma(\sigma+1)\Gamma(n+\beta+1)\Gamma(\alpha-\sigma+n)}{\Gamma(\beta+\sigma+n+2)}$ |
| $(1-x)^{\sigma-\beta}P_m^{\alpha,\sigma}(x), \ \Re \sigma>-1 \,$ | $\frac{2^{\alpha+\sigma+1}}{m!(n-m)!}\frac{\Gamma(n+\alpha+1)\Gamma(\alpha+\beta+m+n+1)\Gamma(\sigma+m+1)\Gamma(\alpha-\beta+1)}{\Gamma(\alpha+\beta+n+1)\Gamma(\alpha+\sigma+m+n+2)\Gamma(\alpha-\beta+m+1)}$ |
| $2^{\alpha+\beta}Q^{-1}(1-z+Q)^{-\alpha}(1+z+Q)^{-\beta},\ Q=(1-2xz+z^2)^{1/2},\ |z|<1\,$ | $\sum_{n=0}^\infty \delta_n z^n$ |
| $(1-x)^{-\alpha}(1+x)^{-\beta} \frac{d}{dx}\left[(1-x)^{\alpha+1}(1+x)^{\beta+1} \frac{d}{dx}\right]F(x) \,$ | $-n(n+\alpha+\beta+1)f^{\alpha,\beta}(n)$ |
| $\left\{(1-x)^{-\alpha}(1+x)^{-\beta} \frac{d}{dx}\left[(1-x)^{\alpha+1}(1+x)^{\beta+1} \frac{d}{dx}\right]\right\}^kF(x) \,$ | $(-1)^kn^k(n+\alpha+\beta+1)^kf^{\alpha,\beta}(n)$ |
