= Transformation (function) =

Function that applies a set to itself

A composition of four mappings coded in SVG, which transforms a rectangular repetitive pattern into a rhombic pattern. The four transformations are linear.

In mathematics, a transformation, transform, or self-map is a function f, usually with some geometrical underpinning, that maps a set X to itself, i.e. f: X → X. Examples include linear transformations of vector spaces and geometric transformations, which include projective transformations, affine transformations, and specific affine transformations, such as rotations, reflections and translations.

== Partial transformations ==
While it is common to use the term transformation for any function of a set into itself (especially in terms like "transformation semigroup" and similar), there exists an alternative form of terminological convention in which the term "transformation" is reserved only for bijections. When such a narrow notion of transformation is generalized to partial functions, then a partial transformation is a function f: A → B, where both A and B are subsets of some set X.

== Algebraic structures ==
The set of all transformations on a given base set, together with function composition, forms a regular semigroup.

== Combinatorics ==
For a finite set of cardinality n, there are n^{n} transformations and (n+1)^{n} partial transformations.

== See also ==
- Endofunction
- Coordinate transformation
- Data transformation (statistics)
- Geometric transformation
- Infinitesimal transformation
- Linear transformation
- List of transforms
- Rigid transformation
- Transformation geometry
- Transformation semigroup
- Transformation group
- Transformation matrix
