= Bateman transform =

Method for solving the Laplace equation in four dimensions

In the mathematical study of partial differential equations, the Bateman transform is a method for solving the Laplace equation in four dimensions and wave equation in three by using a line integral of a holomorphic function in three complex variables. It is named after the mathematician Harry Bateman, who first published the result in (Bateman 1904).

The formula asserts that if ƒ is a holomorphic function of three complex variables, then

$$\phi(w, x, y, z) = \oint_\gamma f\big((w + ix) + (iy + z)\zeta, (iy - z) + (w - ix)\zeta, \zeta\big) \,d\zeta$$

is a solution of the Laplace equation, which follows by differentiation under the integral. Furthermore, Bateman asserted that the most general solution of the Laplace equation arises in this way.
