= Fastest Fourier Transform in the West =

Software library for computing discrete Fourier transforms

FFTW
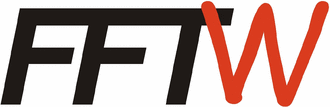
- The FFTW logo
- Developers: Matteo Frigo and Steven G. Johnson
- Initial release: 24 March 1997
- Stable release: 3.3.10 / 15 September 2021; 4 years ago
- Written in: C, OCaml
- Type: Numerical software
- License: GPLv2-or-later, proprietary
- Website: www.fftw.org
- Repository: github.com/FFTW/fftw3

The Fastest Fourier Transform in the West (FFTW) is a software library for computing discrete Fourier transforms (DFTs) developed by Matteo Frigo and Steven G. Johnson at the Massachusetts Institute of Technology.

FFTW is one of the fastest free software implementations of the fast Fourier transform (FFT). It implements the FFT algorithm for real and complex-valued arrays of arbitrary size and dimension.

== Library ==
FFTW expeditiously transforms data by supporting a variety of algorithms and choosing the one (a particular decomposition of the transform into smaller transforms) it estimates or measures to be preferable in the particular circumstances. It works best on arrays of sizes with small prime factors, with powers of two being optimal and large primes being worst case (but still O(n log n)). To decompose transforms of composite sizes into smaller transforms, it chooses among several variants of the Cooley–Tukey FFT algorithm (corresponding to different factorizations and/or different memory-access patterns), while for prime sizes it uses either Rader's or Bluestein's FFT algorithm. Once the transform has been broken up into subtransforms of sufficiently small sizes, FFTW uses hard-coded unrolled FFTs for these small sizes that were produced (at compile time, not at run time) by code generation; these routines use a variety of algorithms including Cooley–Tukey variants, Rader's algorithm, and prime-factor FFT algorithms.

For a sufficiently large number of repeated transforms it is advantageous to measure the performance of some or all of the supported algorithms on the given array size and platform. These measurements, which the authors refer to as "wisdom", can be stored in a file or string for later use.

FFTW has a "guru interface" that intends "to expose as much as possible of the flexibility in the underlying FFTW architecture". This allows, among other things, multi-dimensional transforms and multiple transforms in a single call (e.g., where the data is interleaved in memory).

FFTW has limited support for out-of-order transforms (using the Message Passing Interface (MPI) version). The data reordering incurs an overhead, which for in-place transforms of arbitrary size and dimension is non-trivial to avoid. It is undocumented for which transforms this overhead is significant.

FFTW is licensed under version 2 or later of the GNU General Public License. It is also available under a nonfree license (for a cost of up to $12,500) by MIT and is used in the commercial MATLAB matrix package for calculating FFTs. FFTW is written in the C language, but Fortran and Ada interfaces exist, as well as interfaces for a few other languages. While the library itself is C, the code is actually generated from a program called 'genfft', which is written in OCaml.

In 1999, FFTW won the J. H. Wilkinson Prize for Numerical Software.

== See also ==
- FFTPACK
- List of open-source mathematical libraries
