= Vector-radix FFT algorithm =

Multidimensional fast Fourier transform algorithm

The vector-radix FFT algorithm, is a multidimensional fast Fourier transform (FFT) algorithm, which is a generalization of the ordinary Cooley–Tukey FFT algorithm that divides the transform dimensions by arbitrary radices. It breaks a multidimensional (MD) discrete Fourier transform (DFT) down into successively smaller MD DFTs until, ultimately, only trivial MD DFTs need to be evaluated.

The most common multidimensional FFT algorithm is the row-column algorithm, which means transforming the array first in one index and then in the other, see more in FFT. Then a radix-2 direct 2-D FFT has been developed, and it can eliminate 25% of the multiplies as compared to the conventional row-column approach. And this algorithm has been extended to rectangular arrays and arbitrary radices, which is the general vector-radix algorithm.

Vector-radix FFT algorithm can reduce the number of complex multiplications significantly, compared to row-vector algorithm. For example, for a $N^M$ element matrix (M dimensions, and size N on each dimension), the number of complex multiples of vector-radix FFT algorithm for radix-2 is $\frac{2^M -1}{2^M} N^M \log_2 N$, meanwhile, for row-column algorithm, it is $\frac{M N^M} 2 \log_2 N$. And generally, even larger savings in multiplies are obtained when this algorithm is operated on larger radices and on higher dimensional arrays.

Overall, the vector-radix algorithm significantly reduces the structural complexity of the traditional DFT having a better indexing scheme, at the expense of a slight increase in arithmetic operations. So this algorithm is widely used for many applications in engineering, science, and mathematics, for example, implementations in image processing, and high speed FFT processor designing.

== 2-D DIT case ==
As with the Cooley–Tukey FFT algorithm, the two dimensional vector-radix FFT is derived by decomposing the regular 2-D DFT into sums of smaller DFT's multiplied by "twiddle" factors.

A decimation-in-time (DIT) algorithm means the decomposition is based on time domain $x$, see more in Cooley–Tukey FFT algorithm.

We suppose the 2-D DFT is defined

$$X(k_1,k_2) = \sum_{n_1=0}^{N_1-1} \sum_{n_2=0}^{N_2-1}  x[n_1, n_2] \cdot W_{N_1}^{k_1 n_1} W_{N_2}^{k_2 n_2},$$

where $k_1 = 0,\dots,N_1-1$, and $k_2 = 0,\dots,N_2-1$, and $x[n_1, n_2]$ is an $N_1 \times N_2$ matrix, and $W_N = \exp(-j 2\pi /N)$.

For simplicity, let us assume that $N_1=N_2=N$, and the radix-$(r\times r)$ is such that $N/r$ is an integer.

Using the change of variables:

- $n_i=rp_i+q_i$, where $p_i=0,\ldots,(N/r)-1; q_i = 0,\ldots,r-1;$
- $k_i=u_i+v_i N/r$, where $u_i=0,\ldots,(N/r)-1; v_i = 0,\ldots,r-1;$

where $i = 1$ or $2$, then the two dimensional DFT can be written as:

$$X(u_1+v_1 N/r,u_2+v_2 N/r)=\sum_{q_1=0}^{r-1} \sum_{q_2=0}^{r-1} \left[ \sum_{p_1=0}^{N/r-1} \sum_{p_2=0}^{N/r-1} x[rp_1+q_1, rp_2+q_2] W_{N/r}^{p_1 u_1} W_{N/r}^{p_2 u_2} \right] \cdot W_N^{q_1 u_1+q_2 u_2} W_r^{q_1 v_1} W_r^{q_2 v_2},$$

One stage "butterfly" for DIT vector-radix 2x2 FFT

The equation above defines the basic structure of the 2-D DIT radix-$(r\times r)$ "butterfly". (See 1-D "butterfly" in Cooley–Tukey FFT algorithm)

When $r=2$, the equation can be broken into four summations, and this leads to:

$X(k_1,k_2) = S_{00}(k_1,k_2) + S_{01}(k_1,k_2) W_N^{k_2} +S_{10}(k_1,k_2) W_N^{k_1} + S_{11}(k_1,k_2) W_N^{k_1+k_2}$ for $0\leq k_1, k_2 < \frac{N}{2}$,

where $S_{ij}(k_1,k_2)=\sum_{n_1=0}^{N/2-1} \sum_{n_2=0}^{N/2-1} x[2 n_1 + i, 2 n_2 + j] \cdot W_{N/2}^{n_1 k_1} W_{N/2}^{n_2 k_2}$.

The $S_{ij}$ can be viewed as the $N/2$-dimensional DFT, each over a subset of the original sample:

- $S_{00}$ is the DFT over those samples of $x$ for which both $n_1$ and $n_2$ are even;
- $S_{01}$ is the DFT over the samples for which $n_1$ is even and $n_2$ is odd;
- $S_{10}$ is the DFT over the samples for which $n_1$ is odd and $n_2$ is even;
- $S_{11}$ is the DFT over the samples for which both $n_1$ and $n_2$ are odd.

Thanks to the periodicity of the complex exponential, we can obtain the following additional identities, valid for $0\leq k_1, k_2 < \frac{N}{2}$:

- $X\biggl(k_1+\frac{N}{2},k_2\biggr) = S_{00}(k_1,k_2) + S_{01}(k_1,k_2) W_N^{k_2} -S_{10}(k_1,k_2) W_N^{k_1} - S_{11}(k_1,k_2) W_N^{k_1+k_2}$;
- $X\biggl(k_1,k_2+\frac{N}{2}\biggr) = S_{00}(k_1,k_2) - S_{01}(k_1,k_2) W_N^{k_2} +S_{10}(k_1,k_2) W_N^{k_1} - S_{11}(k_1,k_2) W_N^{k_1+k_2}$;
- $X\biggl(k_1+\frac{N}{2},k_2+\frac{N}{2}\biggr) = S_{00}(k_1,k_2) - S_{01}(k_1,k_2) W_N^{k_2} -S_{10}(k_1,k_2) W_N^{k_1} + S_{11}(k_1,k_2) W_N^{k_1+k_2}$.

== 2-D DIF case ==
Similarly, a decimation-in-frequency (DIF, also called the Sande–Tukey algorithm) algorithm means the decomposition is based on frequency domain $X$, see more in Cooley–Tukey FFT algorithm.

Using the change of variables:

- $n_i=p_i+q_i N/r$, where $p_i=0,\ldots,(N/r)-1; q_i = 0,\ldots,r-1;$
- $k_i=r u_i+v_i$, where $u_i=0,\ldots,(N/r)-1; v_i = 0,\ldots,r-1;$

where $i = 1$ or $2$, and the DFT equation can be written as:

$$X(r u_1+v_1,r u_2+v_2)=\sum_{p_1=0}^{N/r-1} \sum_{p_2=0}^{N/r-1} \left[ \sum_{q_1=0}^{r-1} \sum_{q_2=0}^{r-1} x[p_1+q_1 N/r, p_2+q_2 N/r] W_{r}^{q_1 v_1} W_{r}^{q_2 v_2} \right] \cdot W_{N}^{p_1 v_1+p_2 v_2} W_{N/r}^{p_1 u_1} W_{N/r}^{p_2 u_2},$$

== Other approaches ==
The split-radix FFT algorithm has been proved to be a useful method for 1-D DFT. And this method has been applied to the vector-radix FFT to obtain a split vector-radix FFT.

In conventional 2-D vector-radix algorithm, we decompose the indices $k_1,k_2$ into 4 groups:

$$\begin{array}{lcl}
X(2 k_1, 2 k_2) & : & \text{even-even} \\
X(2 k_1, 2 k_2 +1) & : & \text{even-odd} \\
X(2 k_1 +1, 2 k_2) & : & \text{odd-even} \\
X(2 k_1+1, 2 k_2+1) & : & \text{odd-odd}
\end{array}$$

By the split vector-radix algorithm, the first three groups remain unchanged, the fourth odd-odd group is further decomposed into another four sub-groups, and seven groups in total:

$$\begin{array}{lcl}
X(2 k_1, 2 k_2) & : & \text{even-even} \\
X(2 k_1, 2 k_2 +1) & : & \text{even-odd} \\
X(2 k_1 +1, 2 k_2) & : & \text{odd-even} \\
X(4 k_1+1, 4 k_2+1) & : & \text{odd-odd} \\
X(4 k_1+1, 4 k_2+3) & : & \text{odd-odd} \\
X(4 k_1+3, 4 k_2+1) & : & \text{odd-odd} \\
X(4 k_1+3, 4 k_2+3) & : & \text{odd-odd}
\end{array}$$

That means the fourth term in 2-D DIT radix-$(2\times 2)$ equation, $S_{11}(k_1,k_2) W_{N}^{k_1+k_2}$ becomes:

$$A_{11}(k_1,k_2) W_N^{k_1+k_2} + A_{13}(k_1,k_2) W_N^{k_1+3 k_2} +A_{31}(k_1,k_2) W_N^{3 k_1+k_2} + A_{33}(k_1,k_2) W_N^{3(k_1+k_2)},$$

where $A_{ij}(k_1,k_2)=\sum_{n_1=0}^{N/4-1} \sum_{n_2=0}^{N/4-1} x[4 n_1 + i, 4 n_2 + j] \cdot W_{N/4}^{n_1 k_1} W_{N/4}^{n_2 k_2}$

The 2-D N by N DFT is then obtained by successive use of the above decomposition, up to the last stage.

It has been shown that the split vector radix algorithm has saved about 30% of the complex multiplications and about the same number of the complex additions for typical $1024\times 1024$ array, compared with the vector-radix algorithm.
