= FHT =

FHT may refer to:

- Fast Hartley transform
- Feminizing hormone therapy
- Fetal heart tones
- First-hitting-time model
- Female hose thread, for the female garden hose thread
