= Steven G. Johnson =

American mathematician (born 1973)

- Born: 1973 (age 52–53); St. Charles, Illinois, U.S.
- Education: Massachusetts Institute of Technology
- Known for: FFTW, Meep, MPB
- Awards: J. H. Wilkinson Prize for Numerical Software (1999)
- Scientific career
- Fields: Mathematics; Physics; Computer science
- Workplaces: MIT
- Thesis: Photonic Crystals: From Theory to Practice (2001)
- Doctoral advisor: John Joannopoulos
- Website: math.mit.edu/~stevenj/

Steven Glenn Johnson (born 1973) is an American applied mathematician and physicist known for being a co-creator of the FFTW library for software-based fast Fourier transforms and for his work on photonic crystals. He is professor of Applied Mathematics at MIT where he leads a group on Nanostructures and Computation.

While working on his PhD at MIT, he developed the Fastest Fourier Transform in the West (FFTW) library with funding from the DoD NDSEG Fellowship. Steven Johnson and his colleague Matteo Frigo were awarded the 1999 J. H. Wilkinson Prize for Numerical Software for this work.

He is the author of the NLOpt library for nonlinear optimization, as well as being the co-author of the open-source electromagnetic softwares Meep and MPB. He is a frequent contributor to the Julia programming language, and he has also contributed to Python, R, and Matlab. He was a keynote speaker for the 2019 JuliaCon conference.

== Selected publications ==
Articles

- Johnson, Steven G.; Fan, Shanhui; Villeneuve, Pierre R.; Joannopoulos, J. D.; Kolodziejski, L. A. (1999). "Guided modes in photonic crystal slabs". Physical Review B. 60 (8): 5751. Bibcode:1999PhRvB..60.5751J. doi:10.1103/PhysRevB.60.5751.
- Johnson, Steven G.; Joannopoulos, J. D. (2001). "Block-iterative frequency-domain methods for Maxwell's equations in a planewave basis". Optics Express. 8 (3): 173–190. Bibcode:2001OExpr...8..173J. doi:10.1364/OE.8.000173.
- Luo, Chiyan; Johnson, Steven G.; Joannopoulos, J. D.; Pendry, J. B. (2002). "All-angle negative refraction without negative effective index". Physical Review B. 65 (20) 201104. Bibcode:2002PhRvB..65t1104L. doi:10.1103/PhysRevB.65.201104.
- Frigo, M.; Johnson, S.G. (2005). "The design and implementation of FFTW3". Proceedings of the IEEE. 93 (2): 216–231. Bibcode:2005IEEEP..93..216F. doi:10.1109/JPROC.2004.840301.
- Oskooi, Ardavan F.; Roundy, David; Ibanescu, Mihai; Bermel, Peter; Joannopoulos, J.D.; Johnson, Steven G. (March 2010). "Meep: A flexible free-software package for electromagnetic simulations by the FDTD method". Computer Physics Communications. 181 (3): 687–702. Bibcode:2010CoPhC.181..687O. doi:10.1016/j.cpc.2009.11.008. hdl:1721.1/60946.
- Hsu, Chia Wei; Zhen, Bo; Lee, Jeongwon; Chua, Song-Liang; Johnson, Steven G.; Joannopoulos, John D.; Soljačić, Marin (2013). "Observation of trapped light within the radiation continuum". Nature. 499 (7457): 188–191. Bibcode:2013Natur.499..188H. doi:10.1038/nature12289. hdl:1721.1/110846. PMID 23846657.

Books

- Johnson, Steven G.; Joannopoulos, John D. (2001). Photonic Crystals: The Road from Theory to Practice. Springer.
- Joannopoulos, John D.; Johnson, Steven G.; Winn, Joshua N.; Meade, Robert D. (2008). Photonic Crystals: Molding the Flow of Light (2 ed.). Princeton.
