= C. Sidney Burrus =

American electrical engineer (1934–2021)

Charles Sidney Burrus (October 9, 1934 in Abilene, Texas - April 3, 2021) was an American electrical engineer and the Maxfield and Oshman Professor Emeritus of Electrical and Computer Engineering at Rice University in Houston, Texas. He is widely known for his contributions to digital signal processing, especially FFT algorithms, IIR filter design, and wavelets.

== Academic career ==
Burrus received his bachelor's and master's degree from Rice University, after which he served two years in the Navy, teaching electrical engineering at the Naval Nuclear Power School. He returned to school and received his Ph.D. from Stanford University. In 1965 he joined the faculty at Rice, where he began teaching and research in digital signal processing. He served as chairman of the Electrical and Computer Engineering department from 1984 to 1992, was director of the Computer and Information Technology Institute from 1992 to 1998, and was appointed dean of Engineering in 1998. He became part of the Connexions Project in 1999, where he served as Senior Strategist.

Burrus wrote five textbooks and published more than 200 papers.

== Affiliations and awards ==
- Life Fellow, IEEE
- IEEE Jack S. Kilby Signal Processing Medal (2009)
- Rice teaching awards in 1969, 1974–76, 1980, 1989
- Senior Fulbright Fellowship 1979
- Third Millennium Medal of the IEEE 2000
