= G. C. Danielson =

American physicist (1912–1983)

Gordon Charles Danielson (October 28, 1912 - September 30, 1983) was a Distinguished Professor in Sciences and Humanities in 1964 at Iowa State University at Ames, Iowa.

His name was added to the Distinguished Professor Award Wall in Beardsher Hall.

A scholarship fund, the Gordon C. Danielson Fund was established in his name.

Danielson collaborated with Cornelius Lanczos to write the paper, Some Improvements in Practical Fourier Analysis and their Application to X-ray Scattering from Liquids (1942). The Danielson-Lanczos lemma, which appears in this paper, is the basis of the Cooley–Tukey FFT algorithm, an efficient algorithm for computing the discrete Fourier transform.

During World War II, Danielson led the MIT Radiation Laboratory's beacon group, which developed navigation aids to improve the accuracy of Allied bombing raids over Europe. Working closely with the British Branch of the Radiation Laboratory (BBRL), a field station that tested and deployed radar into operations, Danielson's group created systems that allowed aircraft to determine their position using signals from ground-based beacons. In the summer of 1943, his team developed Micro-H, an enhancement to the H₂X airborne radar that enabled bombers to fix their position with greater precision by measuring the time delay of crystal-controlled beacon signals. Danielson also directed the crash program to build the Aspen beacon system, which his team completed in four months after it received top priority in August 1943; by October, the first equipped Liberator had arrived at Bedford Army Air Base for testing. Through 1944, he continued coordinating beacon development between Cambridge and the BBRL station in England.

With L. D. Muhlstein he wrote Effects of Ordering on the Transport Properties of Sodium Tungsten Bronze (1967).
