= Rader's FFT algorithm =

Discrete Fourier transform for prime sizes

Rader's algorithm (1968), named for Charles M. Rader of MIT Lincoln Laboratory, is a fast Fourier transform (FFT) algorithm that computes the discrete Fourier transform (DFT) of prime sizes by re-expressing the DFT as a cyclic convolution (the other algorithm for FFTs of prime sizes, Bluestein's algorithm, also works by rewriting the DFT as a convolution).

Since Rader's algorithm only depends upon the periodicity of the DFT kernel, it is directly applicable to any other transform (of prime order) with a similar property, such as a number-theoretic transform or the discrete Hartley transform.

The algorithm can be modified to gain a factor of two savings for the case of DFTs of real data, using a slightly modified re-indexing/permutation to obtain two half-size cyclic convolutions of real data; an alternative adaptation for DFTs of real data uses the discrete Hartley transform.

Winograd extended Rader's algorithm to include prime-power DFT sizes $p^m$, and today Rader's algorithm is sometimes described as a special case of Winograd's FFT algorithm, also called the multiplicative Fourier transform algorithm (Tolimieri et al., 1997), which applies to an even larger class of sizes. However, for composite sizes such as prime powers, the Cooley–Tukey FFT algorithm is much simpler and more practical to implement, so Rader's algorithm is typically only used for large-prime base cases of Cooley–Tukey's recursive decomposition of the DFT.

== Algorithm ==
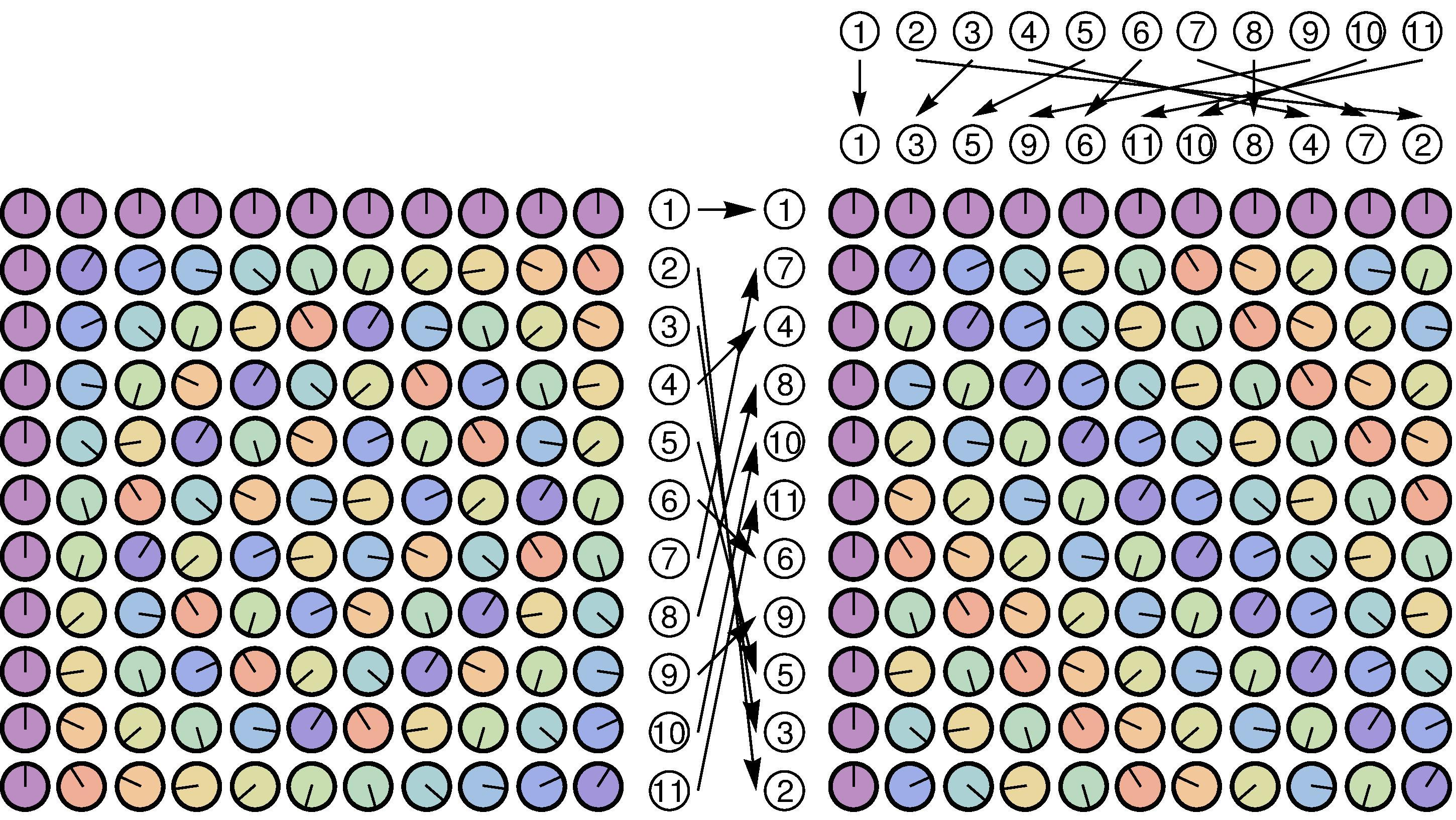
Visual representation of a DFT matrix in Rader's FFT algorithm. The array consists of colored clocks representing a DFT matrix of size 11. By permuting rows and columns (except the first of each) according to sequences generated by the powers of the primitive root of 11, the original DFT matrix becomes a circulant matrix. Multiplying a data sequence with a circulant matrix is equivalent to the cyclic convolution with the matrix's row vector. This relation is an example of the fact that the multiplicative group is cyclic: $(\mathbb Z/p\mathbb Z)^\times \cong C_{p-1}$.

Begin with the definition of the discrete Fourier transform:

$$X_k = \sum_{n=0}^{N-1} x_n e^{-\frac{2\pi i}{N} nk }
\qquad
k = 0,\dots,N-1.$$

If N is a prime number, then the set of non-zero indices $n \in{} \{1,\dots,N-1\}$ forms a group under multiplication modulo N. One consequence of the number theory of such groups is that there exists a generator of the group (sometimes called a primitive root, which can be found by exhaustive search or slightly better algorithms). This generator is an integer g such that $n = g^q \pmod N$ for any non-zero index n and for a unique $q \in{} \{0,\dots,N-2\}$ (forming a bijection from q to non-zero n). Similarly, $k = g^{-p} \pmod N$ for any non-zero index k and for a unique $p \in{} \{0,\dots,N-2\}$, where the negative exponent denotes the multiplicative inverse of $g^p \mod N$. That means that we can rewrite the DFT using these new indices p and q as:

$$X_0 =  \sum_{n=0}^{N-1} x_n,$$

$$X_{g^{-p}} = x_0 +  \sum_{q=0}^{N-2} x_{g^q} e^{-\frac{2\pi i}{N} g^{-(p-q)} }
\qquad
p = 0,\dots,N-2.$$

(Recall that x_{n} and X_{k} are implicitly periodic in N, and also that $e^{2\pi i}=1$ (Euler's identity). Thus, all indices and exponents are taken modulo N as required by the group arithmetic.)

The final summation, above, is precisely a cyclic convolution of the two sequences a_{q} and b_{q} (of length N–1, because $q \in{} \{0,\dots,N-2\}$) defined by:

$$a_q = x_{g^q}$$
$$b_q = e^{-\frac{2\pi i}{N} g^{-q} }.$$

=== Evaluating the convolution ===
Since N–1 is composite, this convolution can be performed directly via the convolution theorem and more conventional FFT algorithms. However, that may not be efficient if N–1 itself has large prime factors, requiring recursive use of Rader's algorithm. Instead, one can compute a length-(N–1) cyclic convolution exactly by zero-padding it to a length of at least 2(N–1)–1, say to a power of two, which can then be evaluated in O(N log N) time without the recursive application of Rader's algorithm.

This algorithm, then, requires O(N) additions plus O(N log N) time for the convolution. In practice, the O(N) additions can often be performed by absorbing the additions into the convolution: if the convolution is performed by a pair of FFTs, then the sum of x_{n} is given by the DC (0th) output of the FFT of a_{q} plus x_{0}, and x_{0} can be added to all the outputs by adding it to the DC term of the convolution prior to the inverse FFT. Still, this algorithm requires intrinsically more operations than FFTs of nearby composite sizes, and typically takes 3–10 times as long in practice.

If Rader's algorithm is performed by using FFTs of size N–1 to compute the convolution, rather than by zero padding as mentioned above, the efficiency depends strongly upon N and the number of times that Rader's algorithm must be applied recursively. The worst case would be if N–1 were 2N_{2} where N_{2} is prime, with N_{2}–1 = 2N_{3} where N_{3} is prime, and so on. Such N_{j} are called Sophie Germain primes, and such a sequence of them is called a Cunningham chain of the first kind. However, the alternative of zero padding can always be employed if N–1 has a large prime factor.
