= Twiddle factor =

Coefficient used in fast Fourier transform (FFT) algorithms

A twiddle factor, in fast Fourier transform (FFT) algorithms, is any of the trigonometric constant coefficients that are multiplied by the data in the course of the algorithm. This term was apparently coined by Gentleman & Sande in 1966, and has since become widespread in thousands of papers of the FFT literature.

More specifically, "twiddle factors" originally referred to the root-of-unity complex multiplicative constants in the butterfly operations of the Cooley–Tukey FFT algorithm, used to recursively combine smaller discrete Fourier transforms. This remains the term's most common meaning, but it may also be used for any data-independent multiplicative constant in an FFT.

The prime-factor FFT algorithm is one unusual case in which an FFT can be performed without twiddle factors, albeit only for restricted factorizations of the transform size.

For example, W_{8}^{2} is a twiddle factor used in 8-point radix-2 FFT.

== Twiddle Factors in the Number Theoretical Transform ==
The Number Theoretic Transform (NTT) is a special kind of FFT. The NTT is often used for polynomial multiplication and operates on integer values in finite fields. The NTT takes the coefficients of polynomials and converts them into the frequency domain, which makes mathematical operations easier. Then once the mathematical operations are finished, the Inverse Number Theoretic Transform (INTT) is used to convert back into the time domain.

An application of NTTs is used for fully homomorphic encryption (FHE). FHE provides strong security for data by allowing computations to be performed on encrypted data without decryption.

However, using the NTT requires hardware resources, mostly for storing the twiddle factors (TF) used during the transformation. To reduce the challenge of implementing bulky hardware with enough memory, Twiddle Factor Generators (TFGs) can be used. An example is a Half-Memory TFG, which uses the symmetry of the TF. The Half-Memory TFG reduces the memory usage by half because only half the TFs need to be stored. The other half of the TFs are calculated using the symmetry of the stored values.
