= Chirp Z-transform =

Mathematical algorithm

The chirp Z-transform (CZT) is a generalization of the discrete Fourier transform (DFT). While the DFT samples the Z plane at uniformly-spaced points along the unit circle, the chirp Z-transform samples along spiral arcs in the Z-plane, corresponding to straight lines in the S plane. The DFT, real DFT, and zoom DFT can be calculated as special cases of the CZT.

Specifically, the chirp Z transform calculates the Z transform at a finite number of points z_{k} along a logarithmic spiral contour, defined as:

$$X_k = \sum_{n=0}^{N-1} x(n) z_{k}^{-n}$$

$$z_k = A\cdot W^{-k}, k=0,1,\dots,M-1$$

where A is the complex starting point, W is the complex ratio between points, and M is the number of points to calculate.

Like the DFT, the chirp Z-transform can be computed in O(n log n) operations where $n = \max(M, N)$. An O(N log N) algorithm for the inverse chirp Z-transform (ICZT) was described in 2003, and in 2019.

== Bluestein's algorithm ==
Bluestein's algorithm expresses the CZT as a convolution and implements it efficiently using FFT/IFFT.

As the DFT is a special case of the CZT, this allows the efficient calculation of discrete Fourier transform (DFT) of arbitrary sizes, including prime sizes. (The other algorithm for FFTs of prime sizes, Rader's algorithm, also works by rewriting the DFT as a convolution.) It was conceived in 1968 by Leo Bluestein. Bluestein's algorithm can be used to compute more general transforms than the DFT, based on the (unilateral) z-transform (Rabiner et al., 1969).

Recall that the DFT is defined by the formula

$$X_k = \sum_{n=0}^{N-1} x_n e^{-\frac{2\pi i}{N} nk }
\qquad
k = 0,\dots,N-1.$$

If we replace the product nk in the exponent by the identity

$$n k = \frac{-(k-n)^2}{2} + \frac{n^2}{2} + \frac{k^2}{2}$$

we thus obtain:

$$X_k = e^{-\frac{\pi i}{N} k^2 } \sum_{n=0}^{N-1} \left( x_n e^{-\frac{\pi i}{N} n^2 } \right) e^{\frac{\pi i}{N} (k-n)^2 }
\qquad
k = 0,\dots,N-1.$$

This summation is precisely a convolution of the two sequences a_{n} and b_{n} defined by:

$$a_n = x_n e^{-\frac{\pi i}{N} n^2 }$$

$$b_n = e^{\frac{\pi i}{N} n^2 },$$

with the output of the convolution multiplied by N phase factors b_{k}^{*}. That is:

$$X_k = b_k^* \left(\sum_{n=0}^{N-1} a_n b_{k-n}\right) \qquad k = 0,\dots,N-1.$$

This convolution, in turn, can be performed with a pair of FFTs (plus the pre-computed FFT of complex chirp b_{n}) via the convolution theorem. The key point is that these FFTs are not of the same length N: such a convolution can be computed exactly from FFTs only by zero-padding it to a length greater than or equal to 2N–1. In particular, one can pad to a power of two or some other highly composite size, for which the FFT can be efficiently performed by e.g. the Cooley–Tukey algorithm in O(N log N) time. Thus, Bluestein's algorithm provides an O(N log N) way to compute prime-size DFTs, albeit several times slower than the Cooley–Tukey algorithm for composite sizes.

The use of zero-padding for the convolution in Bluestein's algorithm deserves some additional comment. Suppose we zero-pad to a length M ≥ 2N–1. This means that a_{n} is extended to an array A_{n} of length M, where A_{n} = a_{n} for 0 ≤ n < N and A_{n} = 0 otherwise—the usual meaning of "zero-padding". However, because of the b_{k–n} term in the convolution, both positive and negative values of n are required for b_{n} (noting that b_{–n} = b_{n}). The periodic boundaries implied by the DFT of the zero-padded array mean that –n is equivalent to M–n. Thus, b_{n} is extended to an array B_{n} of length M, where B_{0} = b_{0}, B_{n} = B_{M–n} = b_{n} for 0 < n < N, and B_{n} = 0 otherwise. A and B are then FFTed, multiplied pointwise, and inverse FFTed to obtain the convolution of a and b, according to the usual convolution theorem.

Let us also be more precise about what type of convolution is required in Bluestein's algorithm for the DFT. If the sequence b_{n} were periodic in n with period N, then it would be a cyclic convolution of length N, and the zero-padding would be for computational convenience only. However, this is not generally the case:

$$b_{n+N} = e^{\frac{\pi i}{N} (n+N)^2 } = b_n \left[ e^{\frac{\pi i}{N} (2Nn+N^2) } \right] = (-1)^N b_n .$$

Therefore, for N even the convolution is cyclic, but in this case N is composite and one would normally use a more efficient FFT algorithm such as Cooley–Tukey. For N odd, however, then b_{n} is antiperiodic and we technically have a negacyclic convolution of length N. Such distinctions disappear when one zero-pads a_{n} to a length of at least 2N−1 as described above, however. It is perhaps easiest, therefore, to think of it as a subset of the outputs of a simple linear convolution (i.e. no conceptual "extensions" of the data, periodic or otherwise).

== z-transforms ==
Bluestein's algorithm can also be used to compute a more general transform based on the (unilateral) z-transform (Rabiner et al., 1969). In particular, it can compute any transform of the form:

$$X_k = \sum_{n=0}^{N-1} x_n z^{nk}
\qquad
k = 0,\dots,M-1,$$

for an arbitrary complex number z and for differing numbers N and M of inputs and outputs. Given Bluestein's algorithm, such a transform can be used, for example, to obtain a more finely spaced interpolation of some portion of the spectrum (although the frequency resolution is still limited by the total sampling time, similar to a Zoom FFT), enhance arbitrary poles in transfer-function analyses, etc.

The algorithm was dubbed the chirp z-transform algorithm because, for the Fourier-transform case (|z| = 1), the sequence b_{n} from above is a complex sinusoid of linearly increasing frequency, which is called a (linear) chirp in radar systems.

== See also ==
- Fractional Fourier transform
