= Poisson summation formula =

Equation in Fourier analysis

In mathematics, the Poisson summation formula is an equation that relates the Fourier series coefficients of the periodic summation of a function to values of the function's continuous Fourier transform. Consequently, the periodic summation of a function is completely defined by discrete samples of the original function's Fourier transform. And conversely, the periodic summation of a function's Fourier transform is completely defined by discrete samples of the original function. The Poisson summation formula was discovered by Siméon Denis Poisson and is sometimes called Poisson resummation.

For a smooth, complex valued function $s(x)$ on $\mathbb R$ which decays at infinity with all derivatives (Schwartz function), the simplest version of the Poisson summation formula states that

| $\sum_{n=-\infty}^\infty s(n)=\sum_{k=-\infty}^\infty S(k).$ | Eq.1 |

where $S$ is the Fourier transform of $s$, i.e., $S(\xi) \triangleq \int_{-\infty}^{\infty} s(x)\ e^{-i2\pi \xi x}\, dx.$ The summation formula can be restated in many equivalent ways, but a simple one is the following. Suppose that $f\in L^1(\mathbb R^n)$ (L^{1} for L^{1} space) and $\Lambda$ is a unimodular lattice in $\mathbb R^n$. Then the periodization of $f$, which is defined as the sum $f_\Lambda(x) = \sum_{\lambda\in\Lambda} f(x+\lambda),$ converges in the $L^1$ norm of $\mathbb R^n/\Lambda$ to an $L^1(\mathbb R^n/\Lambda)$ function having Fourier series
$$f_\Lambda(x) \sim \sum_{\lambda'\in\Lambda'} \hat f(\lambda') e^{2\pi i \lambda' x}$$
where $\Lambda'$ is the dual lattice to $\Lambda$. (Note that the Fourier series on the right-hand side need not converge in $L^1$ or otherwise.)

== Periodization of a function ==
Let $s\left( x \right)$ be a smooth, complex valued function on $\mathbb R$ which decays at infinity with all derivatives (Schwartz function), and its Fourier transform $S\left( f \right)$, defined as
$$S(f) = \int_{-\infty}^\infty s(x) e^{-2\pi i xf}dx.$$
Then $S(f)$ is also a Schwartz function, and we have the reciprocal relationship that
$$s(x) = \int_{-\infty}^\infty S(f) e^{2\pi i x f}df.$$

The periodization of $s(x)$ with period $P>0$ is given by
$$s_{_P}(x) \triangleq \sum_{n=-\infty}^{\infty} s(x + nP).$$
Likewise, the periodization of $S(f)$ with period $1/T$, where $T>0$, is
$$S_{1/T}(f) \triangleq \sum_{k=-\infty}^{\infty} S(f + k/T).$$

Then Eq.1, $\sum_{n=-\infty}^\infty s(n)=\sum_{k=-\infty}^\infty S(k),$ is a special case (P=1, x=0) of this generalization:

| $s_{_P}(x) = \sum_{k=-\infty}^{\infty} \underbrace{\frac{1}{P}\cdot S\left(\frac{k}{P}\right)}_{S[k]}\ e^{i 2\pi \frac{k}{P} x },$ | Eq.2 |

which is a Fourier series expansion with coefficients that are samples of the function $S(f).$ Conversely, Eq.2 follows from Eq.1 by applying the known behavior of the Fourier transform under translations (see the Fourier transform properties time scaling and shifting).

Similarly:

| $S_{1/T}(f) = \sum_{n=-\infty}^{\infty} \underbrace{T\cdot s(nT)}_{s[n]}\ e^{-i 2\pi n Tf},$ | Eq.3 |

also known as the important Discrete-time Fourier transform.

== Derivations ==
We prove that, if $s\in L^1(\mathbb R)$, then the (possibly divergent) Fourier series of $s_P(x)$ is
$$s_{_P}(x)\sim \sum_{k=-\infty}^\infty \frac{1}{P}S\left(\frac{k}{P}\right)e^{2\pi i \frac{k}{P} x}.$$
When $s(x)$ is a Schwartz function, this establishes equality in Eq.2 of the previous section.

First, the periodization $s_P(x)$ converges in $L^1$ norm to an $L^1([0,P])$ function which is periodic on $\mathbb R$, and therefore integrable on any interval of length $P.$ We must therefore show that the Fourier series coefficients of $s_{_P}(x)$ are $\frac{1}{P} S\left(\frac{k}{P}\right)$ where $S\left( f \right)$ is the Fourier transform of $s\left( x \right)$. (Not $S\left[ k \right]$, which is the Fourier coefficient of $s_{_P}(x)$.)

Proceeding from the definition of the Fourier coefficients we have:

$$\begin{align}
S[k]\ &\triangleq \ \frac{1}{P}\int_0^{P} s_{_P}(x)\cdot e^{-i 2\pi \frac{k}{P} x}\, dx\\
&=\ \frac{1}{P}\int_0^{P}
\left(\sum_{n=-\infty}^{\infty} s(x + nP)\right)
\cdot e^{-i 2\pi\frac{k}{P} x}\, dx\\
&=\ \frac{1}{P}
\sum_{n=-\infty}^{\infty}
\int_0^{P} s(x + nP)\cdot e^{-i 2\pi\frac{k}{P} x}\, dx,
\end{align}$$

where the interchange of summation with integration is justified by dominated convergence. With a change of variables ($\tau = x + nP$), this becomes the following, completing the proof of Eq.2:

$$\begin{align}
S[k] =
\frac{1}{P} \sum_{n=-\infty}^{\infty} \int_{nP}^{(n+1)P} s(\tau) \ e^{-i 2\pi \frac{k}{P} \tau} \ \underbrace{e^{i 2\pi k n}}_{1}\,d\tau
\ =\ \frac{1}{P} \int_{-\infty}^{\infty} s(\tau) \ e^{-i 2\pi \frac{k}{P} \tau} d\tau \triangleq \frac{1}{P}\cdot S\left(\frac{k}{P}\right)
\end{align}.$$

This proves Eq.2 for $L^1$ functions, in the sense that the right-hand side is the (possibly divergent) Fourier series of the left-hand side. Similarly, if $S(f)$ is in $L^1(\mathbb R)$, a similar proof shows the corresponding version of Eq.3.

Finally, if $s_{_P}(x)$ has an absolutely convergent Fourier series, then Eq.2 holds as an equality almost everywhere. This is the case, in particular, when $s(x)$ is a Schwartz function. Similarly, Eq.3 holds when $S(f)$ is a Schwartz function.

== Distributional formulation ==
These equations can be interpreted in the language of distributions for a function $s$ whose derivatives are all rapidly decreasing (see Schwartz function). The Poisson summation formula arises as a particular case of the Convolution Theorem on tempered distributions, using the Dirac comb distribution and its Fourier series:

$$\sum_{n=-\infty}^\infty \delta(x - nT) \equiv \sum_{k=-\infty}^\infty  \frac{1}{T}\cdot e^{- i 2\pi \frac{k}{T} x} \quad\stackrel{\mathcal{F}}{\Longleftrightarrow}\quad \frac{1}{T}\cdot \sum_{k=-\infty}^{\infty} \delta (f - k/T).$$

In other words, the periodization of a Dirac delta $\delta,$ resulting in a Dirac comb, corresponds to the discretization of its spectrum which is constantly one. Hence, this again is a Dirac comb but with reciprocal increments.

For the case $T = 1,$ Eq.1 readily follows:

$$\begin{align}
\sum_{k=-\infty}^\infty S(k)
&= \sum_{k=-\infty}^\infty \left(\int_{-\infty}^{\infty} s(x)\ e^{-i 2\pi k x} dx \right)
= \int_{-\infty}^{\infty} s(x) \underbrace{\left(\sum_{k=-\infty}^\infty e^{-i 2\pi k x}\right)}_{\sum_{n=-\infty}^\infty \delta(x-n)} dx \\
&= \sum_{n=-\infty}^\infty  \left(\int_{-\infty}^{\infty} s(x)\ \delta(x-n)\ dx \right) = \sum_{n=-\infty}^\infty s(n).
\end{align}$$

Similarly:

$$\begin{align}
\sum_{k=-\infty}^{\infty} S(f - k/T)
&= \sum_{k=-\infty}^{\infty} \mathcal{F}\left \{ s(x)\cdot e^{i 2\pi\frac{k}{T}x}\right \}\\
&= \mathcal{F} \bigg \{s(x)\underbrace{\sum_{k=-\infty}^{\infty} e^{i 2\pi\frac{k}{T}x}}_{T \sum_{n=-\infty}^{\infty} \delta(x-nT)}\bigg \}
= \mathcal{F}\left \{\sum_{n=-\infty}^{\infty} T\cdot s(nT) \cdot \delta(x-nT)\right \}\\
&= \sum_{n=-\infty}^{\infty} T\cdot s(nT) \cdot \mathcal{F}\left \{\delta(x-nT)\right \}
= \sum_{n=-\infty}^{\infty} T\cdot s(nT) \cdot e^{-i 2\pi nT f}.
\end{align}$$

Or:

$$\begin{align}
\sum_{k=-\infty}^{\infty} S(f - k/T) &= S(f) * \sum_{k=-\infty}^{\infty} \delta(f - k/T) \\
&= S(f) * \mathcal{F}\left \{T \sum_{n=-\infty}^{\infty} \delta(x-nT)\right \} \\
&= \mathcal{F}\left \{s(x)\cdot T \sum_{n=-\infty}^{\infty} \delta(x-nT)\right \}
= \mathcal{F}\left \{\sum_{n=-\infty}^{\infty} T\cdot s(nT) \cdot \delta(x-nT)\right \} \quad \text{as above}.
\end{align}$$

The Poisson summation formula can also be proved quite conceptually using the compatibility of Pontryagin duality with short exact sequences such as $0 \to \Z \to \R \to \R / \Z \to 0.$

== Applicability ==
Eq.2 holds provided $s(x)$ is a continuous integrable function which satisfies $|s(x)| + |S(x)| \le C (1+|x|)^{-1-\delta}$ for some $C > 0,\delta > 0$ and every $x.$ Note that such $s(x)$ is uniformly continuous, this together with the decay assumption on $s$, show that the series defining $s_{_P}$ converges uniformly to a continuous function. Eq.2 holds in the strong sense that both sides converge uniformly and absolutely to the same limit.

Eq.2 holds in a pointwise sense under the strictly weaker assumption that $s$ has bounded variation and

$$2 \cdot s(x)=\lim_{\varepsilon\to 0} s(x+\varepsilon) + \lim_{\varepsilon\to 0} s(x-\varepsilon).$$

The Fourier series on the right-hand side of Eq.2 is then understood as a (conditionally convergent) limit of symmetric partial sums.

As shown above, Eq.2 holds under the much less restrictive assumption that $s(x)$ is in $L^1(\mathbb{R})$, but then it is necessary to interpret it in the sense that the right-hand side is the (possibly divergent) Fourier series of $s_{_P}(x).$ In this case, one may extend the region where equality holds by considering summability methods such as Cesàro summability. When interpreting convergence in this way Eq.2, case $x=0,$ holds under the less restrictive conditions that $s(x)$ is integrable and 0 is a point of continuity of $s_{_P}(x)$. However, Eq.2 may fail to hold even when both $s$ and $S$ are integrable and continuous, and the sums converge absolutely.

== Applications ==
=== Method of images ===
In partial differential equations, the Poisson summation formula provides a rigorous justification for the fundamental solution of the heat equation with absorbing rectangular boundary by the method of images. Here the heat kernel on $\mathbb{R}^2$ is known, and that of a rectangle is determined by taking the periodization. The Poisson summation formula similarly provides a connection between Fourier analysis on Euclidean spaces and on the tori of the corresponding dimensions. In one dimension, the resulting solution is called a theta function.

In electrodynamics, the method is also used to accelerate the computation of periodic Green's functions.

=== Sampling ===
In the statistical study of time-series, if $s$ is a function of time, then looking only at its values at equally spaced points of time is called "sampling." In applications, typically the function $s$ is band-limited, meaning that there is some cutoff frequency $f_o$ such that $S(f)$ is zero for frequencies exceeding the cutoff: $S(f)=0$ for $|f|>f_o.$ For band-limited functions, choosing the sampling rate $\tfrac{1}{T} > 2 f_o$ guarantees that no information is lost: since $S$ can be reconstructed from these sampled values. Then, by Fourier inversion, so can $s.$ This leads to the Nyquist–Shannon sampling theorem.

=== Ewald summation ===
Computationally, the Poisson summation formula is useful since a slowly converging summation in real space is guaranteed to be converted into a quickly converging equivalent summation in Fourier space. (A broad function in real space becomes a narrow function in Fourier space and vice versa.) This is the essential idea behind Ewald summation.

=== Approximations of integrals ===
The Poisson summation formula is also useful to bound the errors obtained when an integral is approximated by a (Riemann) sum. Consider an approximation of $S(0)=\int_{-\infty}^\infty dx \, s(x)$ as $\delta \sum_{n=-\infty}^\infty s(n \delta)$, where $\delta \ll 1$ is the size of the bin. Then, according to Eq.2 this approximation coincides with $\sum_{k=-\infty}^\infty S(k/ \delta)$. The error in the approximation can then be bounded as $\left| \sum_{k \ne 0} S(k/ \delta) \right| \le \sum_{k \ne 0} | S(k/ \delta)|$. This is particularly useful when the Fourier transform of $s(x)$ is rapidly decaying if $1/\delta \gg 1$.

=== Lattice points inside a sphere ===
The Poisson summation formula may be used to derive Landau's asymptotic formula for the number of lattice points inside a large Euclidean sphere. It can also be used to show that if an integrable function, $s$ and $S$ both have compact support then $s = 0.$

=== Number theory ===
In number theory, Poisson summation can also be used to derive a variety of functional equations including the functional equation for the Riemann zeta function.

One important such use of Poisson summation concerns theta functions: periodic summations of Gaussians. Put $q= e^{i\pi \tau }$, for $\tau$ a complex number in the upper half plane, and define the theta function:

$$\theta ( \tau) =  \sum_n q^{n^2}.$$

The relation between $\theta (-1/\tau)$ and $\theta (\tau)$ turns out to be important for number theory, since this kind of relation is one of the defining properties of a modular form. By choosing $s(x)= e^{-\pi x^2}$ and using the fact that $S(f) = e^{-\pi f ^2},$ one can conclude:

$$\theta \left({-1\over\tau}\right) = \sqrt{\tau \over i} \theta (\tau),$$
by putting ${1/\lambda} = \sqrt{\tau/i}.$

It follows from this that $\theta^8$ has a simple transformation property under $\tau \mapsto {-1/ \tau}$ and this can be used to prove Jacobi's formula for the number of different ways to express an integer as the sum of eight perfect squares.

=== Sphere packings ===
Cohn & Elkies proved an upper bound on the density of sphere packings using the Poisson summation formula, which subsequently led to a proof of optimal sphere packings in dimension 8 and 24.

=== Other ===
- Let $s(x) = e^{-ax}$ for $0 \leq x$ and $s(x) = 0$ for $x < 0$ to get
  $$\coth(x) = x\sum_{n \in \Z} \frac{1}{x^2+\pi^2n^2} = \frac{1}{x}+ 2x \sum_{n \in \Z_+} \frac{1}{x^2+\pi^2n^2}.$$
- It can be used to prove the functional equation for the theta function.
- Poisson's summation formula appears in Ramanujan's notebooks and can be used to prove some of his formulas, in particular it can be used to prove one of the formulas in Ramanujan's first letter to Hardy.
- It can be used to calculate the quadratic Gauss sum.

== Generalizations ==
The Poisson summation formula holds in Euclidean space of arbitrary dimension. Let $\Lambda$ be the lattice in $\mathbb{R}^d$ consisting of points with integer coordinates. For a function $s$ in $L^1(\mathbb{R}^d)$, consider the series given by summing the translates of $s$ by elements of $\Lambda$:

$$\mathbb{P}s(x) = \sum_{\nu\in\Lambda} s(x+\nu).$$

Theorem For $s$ in $L^1(\mathbb{R}^d)$, the above series converges pointwise almost everywhere, and defines a $\Lambda$-periodic function on $\mathbb{R}^d$, hence a function $\mathbb{P}s(\bar x)$ on the torus $\mathbb{R}^d/\Lambda.$ a.e. $\mathbb{P}s$ lies in $L^1(\mathbb{R}^d/\Lambda)$ with $\| \mathbb{P}s \|_{L_1(\mathbb{R}^d/\Lambda)} \le \| s \|_{L_1(\mathbb{R})}.$
Moreover, for all $\nu$ in $\Lambda,$

$$\mathbb{P}S(\nu) = \int_{\mathbb{R}^d/\Lambda}\mathbb{P}s(\bar x) e^{-i2\pi  \nu \cdot \bar x} d\bar x$$

(the Fourier transform of $\mathbb{P}s$ on the torus $\mathbb{R}^d/\Lambda$) equals

$$S(\nu) = \int_{\mathbb{R}^d}s(x) e^{-i2\pi\nu \cdot x}\,dx$$

(the Fourier transform of $s$ on $\mathbb{R}^d$).

When $s$ is in addition continuous, and both $s$ and $S$ decay sufficiently fast at infinity, then one can "invert" the Fourier series back to their domain $\mathbb{R}^d$ and make a stronger statement. More precisely, if

$$|s(x)| + |S(x)| \le C (1+|x|)^{-d-\delta}$$

for some C, δ > 0, then

$$\sum_{\nu\in\Lambda} s(x+\nu) = \sum_{\nu\in\Lambda} S(\nu) e^{i 2\pi \nu\cdot x},$$

where both series converge absolutely and uniformly on Λ. When d = 1 and x = 0, this gives Eq.1 above.

More generally, a version of the statement holds if Λ is replaced by a more general lattice in a finite dimensional vector space $V$. Choose a translation invariant measure $m$ on $V$. It is unique up to positive scalar. Again for a function $s \in L_1(V, m)$ we define the periodisation

$$\mathbb{P}s(x) = \sum_{\nu \in \Lambda} s(x + \nu)$$

as above.

The dual lattice $\Lambda'$ is defined as a subset of the dual vector space $V'$ that evaluates to integers on the lattice $\Lambda$ or alternatively, by Pontryagin duality, as the characters of $V$ that contain $\Lambda$ in the kernel. Then the statement is that for all $\nu \in \Lambda'$ the Fourier transform $\mathbb{P}S$ of the periodisation $\mathbb{P}s$ as a function on $V/\Lambda$ and the Fourier transform $S$ of $s$ on $V$ itself are related by proper normalisation

$$\begin{align}
\mathbb{P}S(\nu) &= \frac{1}{m(V/\Lambda)} \int_{V/\Lambda} \mathbb{P}s(\bar x) e^{-i2\pi\langle\nu, \bar x\rangle} m(d\bar x)\\
&= \frac{1}{m(V/\Lambda)} \int_V s(x) e^{-i2\pi\langle\nu, x\rangle} m(dx) \\
&= \frac{1}{m(V/\Lambda)} S(\nu)
\end{align}$$

Note that the right-hand side is independent of the choice of invariant measure $\mu$. If $s$ and $S$ are continuous and tend to zero faster than $1/r^{\dim(V) + \delta}$ then

$$\sum_{\lambda \in \Lambda} s(\lambda +x) = \sum_{\nu \in \Lambda'} \mathbb{P}S(\nu) e^{i2\pi\langle\nu, x\rangle} =  \frac{1}{m(V/\Lambda)} \sum_{\nu \in \Lambda'} S(\nu) e^{i2\pi\langle\nu, x\rangle}$$

In particular

$$\sum_{\lambda \in \Lambda} s(\lambda)  =  \frac{1}{m(V/\Lambda)} \sum_{\nu \in \Lambda'} S(\nu)$$

This is applied in the theory of theta functions and is a possible method in geometry of numbers. In fact in more recent work on counting lattice points in regions it is routinely used − summing the indicator function of a region D over lattice points is exactly the question, so that the LHS of the summation formula is what is sought and the RHS something that can be attacked by mathematical analysis.

=== Selberg trace formula ===
Further generalization to locally compact abelian groups is required in number theory. In non-commutative harmonic analysis, the idea is taken even further in the Selberg trace formula but takes on a much deeper character.

A series of mathematicians applying harmonic analysis to number theory, most notably Martin Eichler, Atle Selberg, Robert Langlands, and James Arthur, have generalised the Poisson summation formula to the Fourier transform on non-commutative locally compact reductive algebraic groups $G$ with a discrete subgroup $\Gamma$ such that $G/\Gamma$ has finite volume. For example, $G$ can be the real points of $SL_n$ and $\Gamma$ can be the integral points of $SL_n$. In this setting, $G$ plays the role of the real number line in the classical version of Poisson summation, and $\Gamma$ plays the role of the integers $n$ that appear in the sum. The generalised version of Poisson summation is called the Selberg Trace Formula and has played a role in proving many cases of Artin's conjecture and in Wiles's proof of Fermat's Last Theorem. The left-hand side of Eq.1 becomes a sum over irreducible unitary representations of $G$, and is called "the spectral side," while the right-hand side becomes a sum over conjugacy classes of $\Gamma$, and is called "the geometric side."

The Poisson summation formula is the archetype for vast developments in harmonic analysis and number theory.

=== Semiclassical trace formula ===
The Selberg trace formula was later generalized to more general smooth manifolds (without any algebraic structure) by Gutzwiller, Balian-Bloch, Chazarain, Colin de Verdière, Duistermaat-Guillemin, Uribe, Guillemin-Melrose, Zelditch and others. The "wave trace" or "semiclassical trace" formula relates geometric and spectral properties of the underlying topological space. The spectral side is the trace of a unitary group of operators (e.g., the Schrödinger or wave propagator) which encodes the spectrum of a differential operator and the geometric side is a sum of distributions which are supported at the lengths of periodic orbits of a corresponding Hamiltonian system. The Hamiltonian is given by the principal symbol of the differential operator which generates the unitary group. For the Laplacian, the "wave trace" has singular support contained in the set of lengths of periodic geodesics; this is called the Poisson relation.

=== Convolution theorem ===
The Poisson summation formula is a particular case of the convolution theorem on tempered distributions. If one of the two factors is the Dirac comb, one obtains periodic summation on one side and sampling on the other side of the equation. Applied to the Dirac delta function and its Fourier transform, the function that is constantly 1, this yields the Dirac comb identity.

== See also ==
- Fourier analysis § Summary
- Post's inversion formula
- Voronoi formula
- Discrete-time Fourier transform
- Explicit formulae for L-functions
- Riemann–Roch theorem § Arithmetic Riemann–Roch theorem
