= Conjugate Fourier series =

In the mathematical field of Fourier analysis, the conjugate Fourier series arises by realizing the Fourier series formally as the boundary values of the real part of a holomorphic function on the unit disc. The imaginary part of that function then defines the conjugate series. Zygmund (1968) studied the delicate questions of convergence of this series, and its relationship with the Hilbert transform.

In detail, consider a trigonometric series of the form

$$f(\theta) = \tfrac12 a_0 + \sum_{n=1}^\infty \left(a_n\cos n\theta + b_n\sin n\theta\right)$$

in which the coefficients a_{n} and b_{n} are real numbers. This series is the real part of the power series

$$F(z) = \tfrac12 a_0 + \sum_{n=1}^\infty (a_n-ib_n)z^n$$

along the unit circle with $z=e^{i\theta}$. The imaginary part of F(z) is called the conjugate series of f, and is denoted

$$\tilde{f}(\theta) = \sum_{n=1}^\infty \left(a_n\sin n\theta - b_n\cos n\theta\right).$$

== See also ==
- Harmonic conjugate
