= Discrete Fourier series =

Series in digital signal processing

In digital signal processing, a discrete Fourier series (DFS) is a Fourier series whose sinusoidal components are functions of a discrete variable instead of a continuous variable. The result of the series is also a function of the discrete variable, i.e. a discrete sequence. A Fourier series, by nature, has a discrete set of components with a discrete set of coefficients, also a discrete sequence. So a DFS is a representation of one sequence in terms of another sequence. Well known examples are the Discrete Fourier transform and its inverse transform.

== Introduction ==
=== Relation to Fourier series ===
The exponential form of Fourier series is given by:

$$s(t) = \sum_{k=-\infty}^\infty S[k]\cdot e^{i2\pi \frac{k}{P} t},$$

which is periodic with an arbitrary period denoted by $P.$ When continuous time $t$ is replaced by discrete time $nT,$ for integer values of $n$ and time interval $T,$ the series becomes:

$$s(nT) = \sum_{k=-\infty}^\infty  S[k]\cdot e^{i 2\pi \frac{k}{P}nT},\quad n \in \mathbb{Z}.$$

With $n$ constrained to integer values, we normally constrain the ratio $P/T=N$ to an integer value, resulting in an $N$-periodic function:

Discrete Fourier series

$$s_{_N}[n] \triangleq s(nT) = \sum_{k=-\infty}^\infty  S[k]\cdot e^{i 2\pi \frac{k}{N}n}$$

which are harmonics of a fundamental digital frequency $1/N.$ The $N$ subscript reminds us of its periodicity. And we note that some authors will refer to just the $S[k]$ coefficients themselves as a discrete Fourier series.

Due to the $N$-periodicity of the $e^{i 2\pi \tfrac{k}{N} n}$ kernel, the infinite summation can be "folded" as follows:

$$\begin{align}
s_{_N}[n] &= \sum_{m=-\infty}^{\infty}\left(\sum_{k=0}^{N-1}e^{i 2\pi \tfrac{k-mN}{N}n}\ S[k-mN]\right)\\
&= \sum_{k=0}^{N-1}e^{i 2\pi \tfrac{k}{N}n}
\underbrace{\left(\sum_{m=-\infty}^{\infty}S[k-mN]\right)}_{\triangleq S_N[k]},
\end{align}$$

which is the inverse DFT of one cycle of the periodic summation, $S_N.$
