= Channelizer =

In digital signal processing, a channelizer is a device or algorithm that takes a generally wideband signal as an input and produces two or more narrowband output signals that each contains a frequency sub-band of the input signal. The output signals are called either channels, bands, or sub-bands. The bandwidth of each output signal is narrower than that of the input signal. As a result, the output signals typically have lower sampling rates than the sampling rate of the input signal.

A channelizer is a type of Filter bank.

Channelizers are often used in algorithms that process each channel in a different way and then recombine the channels to achieve a desired effect. The resulting effect is frequency dependent. A common example is an electronic equalizer.

One of the most common methods for selecting a channel from an input signal is to first shift the frequency by multiplying it with a complex sinusoid, then passing the signal through a low pass filter. Alternatively, a decimator (rate changer) can be used. One common type of channelizer is the polyphase channelizer.
