= Locally compact abelian group =

Topological group structure arising in Fourier analysis

In several mathematical areas, including harmonic analysis, topology, and number theory, locally compact abelian groups are abelian groups which have a particularly convenient topology on them. For example, the group of integers (equipped with the discrete topology), or the real numbers or the circle (both with their usual topology) are locally compact abelian groups.

== Definition and examples ==
A topological group is called locally compact if the underlying topological space is locally compact and Hausdorff; the topological group is called abelian if the underlying group is abelian.

Examples of locally compact abelian groups include:

- $\R^n$ for n a positive integer, with vector addition as group operation.
- The positive real numbers $\R^+$ with multiplication as operation. This group is isomorphic to $(\R, +)$ by the exponential map.
- Any finite abelian group, with the discrete topology. By the structure theorem for finite abelian groups, all such groups are products of cyclic groups.
- The integers $\Z$ under addition, again with the discrete topology.
- The circle group, denoted $\mathbb{T}$ for torus. This is the group of complex numbers of modulus 1. $\mathbb{T}$ is isomorphic as a topological group to the quotient group $\R/\Z$.
- The field $\Q_p$ of p-adic numbers under addition, with the usual p-adic topology.

== The dual group ==
If $G$ is a locally compact abelian group, a character of $G$ is a continuous group homomorphism from $G$ with values in the circle group $\mathbb{T}$. The set of all characters on $G$ can be made into a locally compact abelian group, called the dual group of $G$ and denoted $\widehat G$. The group operation on the dual group is given by pointwise multiplication of characters, the inverse of a character is its complex conjugate and the topology on the space of characters is that of uniform convergence on compact sets (i.e., the compact-open topology, viewing $\widehat{G}$ as a subset of the space of all continuous functions from $G$ to $\mathbb{T}$.). This topology is in general not metrizable. However, if the group $G$ is a separable locally compact abelian group, then the dual group is metrizable.

This is analogous to the dual space in linear algebra: just as for a vector space $V$ over a field $K$, the dual space is $\mathrm{Hom}(V, K)$, so too is the dual group $\mathrm{Hom}(G, \mathbb{T})$. More abstractly, these are both examples of representable functors, being represented respectively by $K$ and $\mathbb{T}$.

A group that is isomorphic (as topological groups) to its dual group is called self-dual. While the reals and finite cyclic groups are self-dual, the group and the dual group are not naturally isomorphic, and should be thought of as two different groups.

=== Examples of dual groups ===
The dual of $\Z$ is isomorphic to the circle group $\mathbb{T}$. A character on the infinite cyclic group of integers $\Z$ under addition is determined by its value at the generator 1. Thus for any character $\chi$ on $\Z$, $\chi(n) = \chi(1)^n$. Moreover, this formula defines a character for any choice of $\chi(1)$ in $\mathbb{T}$. The topology of uniform convergence on compact sets is in this case the topology of pointwise convergence. This is the topology of the circle group inherited from the complex numbers.

The dual of $\mathbb{T}$ is canonically isomorphic with $\Z$. Indeed, a character on $\mathbb{T}$ is of the form $z\mapsto z^n$ for $n$ an integer. Since $\mathbb{T}$ is compact, the topology on the dual group is that of uniform convergence, which turns out to be the discrete topology.

The group of real numbers $\R$, is isomorphic to its own dual; the characters on $\R$ are of the form $r\mapsto e^{i\theta r}$ for $\theta$ a real number. With these dualities, the version of the Fourier transform to be introduced next coincides with the classical Fourier transform on $\R$.

Analogously, the group of $p$-adic numbers $\Q_p$ is isomorphic to its dual. (In fact, any finite extension of $\Q_p$ is also self-dual.) It follows that the adeles are self-dual.

== Pontryagin duality ==
Pontryagin duality asserts that the functor

$$G \mapsto \hat G$$

induces an equivalence of categories between the opposite of the category of locally compact abelian groups (with continuous morphisms) and itself:

$$LCA^{op} \stackrel \cong \longrightarrow LCA.$$

== Categorical properties ==
Clausen (2017) shows that the category LCA of locally compact abelian groups measures, very roughly speaking, the difference between the integers and the reals. More precisely, the algebraic K-theory spectrum of the category of locally compact abelian groups and the ones of Z and R lie in a homotopy fiber sequence

$$K(\mathbf Z) \to K(\mathbf R) \to K(LCA).$$

== See also ==
- Haar measure
