= Dirac comb =

Periodic distribution ("function") of "point-mass" Dirac delta sampling

The graph of the Dirac comb function is an infinite series of Dirac delta functions spaced at intervals of T

In mathematics, a Dirac comb (also known as sha function, impulse train or sampling function) is a periodic generalized function with the formula
$$\operatorname{\text{Ш}}_{T}(t) := \sum_{k=-\infty}^{\infty} \delta(t - k T)$$
for some given period $T$. Here $t$ is a real variable and the sum extends over all integers $k$. The Dirac delta function $\delta$ and the Dirac comb are tempered distributions. The graph of the function resembles a comb (with the $\delta$s as the comb's 'teeth'), hence its name and the use of the comb-like Cyrillic letter sha (Ш) to denote the function.

The symbol $\text{Ш}(t)$, where the period $T$ is omitted, represents a Dirac comb of unit period:
$$\operatorname{\text{Ш}}(t) := \operatorname{\text{Ш}}_{1}(t) = \sum_{k=-\infty}^{\infty} \delta(t - k)$$
This implies
$$\operatorname{\text{Ш}}_{T}(t) = \frac{1}{T}\operatorname{\text{Ш}}\!\left({t}/{T}\right).$$

Because the Dirac comb function is periodic, it can be represented as a Fourier series based on the Dirichlet kernel:
$$\operatorname{\text{Ш}}_{T}(t) = \frac{1}{T}\sum_{n=-\infty}^{\infty} e^{i 2 \pi n {t}/{T}}.$$

The Dirac comb function allows one to represent both continuous and discrete phenomena, such as sampling and aliasing, in a single framework of continuous Fourier analysis on tempered distributions, without any reference to Fourier series. The Fourier transform of a Dirac comb is another Dirac comb. Owing to the convolution theorem on tempered distributions which turns out to be the Poisson summation formula, in signal processing, the Dirac comb allows modelling sampling by multiplication with it, but it also allows modelling periodization by convolution with it.

== Dirac-comb identity ==
The Dirac comb can be constructed in two ways, either by using the comb operator (performing sampling) applied to the constant function $1$, or, alternatively, by using the rep operator (performing periodization) applied to the Dirac delta $\delta$. Formally, this yields the following:
$$\operatorname{comb}_T \{1\} = \operatorname{\text{Ш}}_T = \operatorname{rep}_T \{\delta \},$$
where
$$\operatorname{comb}_T \{f(t)\} \triangleq \sum_{k=-\infty}^\infty \, f(kT) \, \delta(t - kT)$$
and
$$\operatorname{rep}_T \{g(t)\} \triangleq \sum_{k=-\infty}^\infty \, g(t - kT).$$

In signal processing, this property on one hand allows sampling a function $f(t)$ by multiplication with $\text{Ш}_{T}$, and on the other hand it also allows the periodization of $f(t)$ by convolution with $\text{Ш}_T$. The Dirac comb identity is a particular case of the Convolution Theorem for tempered distributions.

== Scaling ==
The scaling property of the Dirac comb follows from the properties of the Dirac delta function. Since $\delta(t) = \tfrac{1}{a} \delta\!\left(\tfrac{t}{a}\right)$ for positive real numbers $a$, it follows that:
$$\operatorname{\text{Ш}}_{T}\left(t\right) = \frac{1}{T} \operatorname{\text{Ш}}\!\left( \frac{t}{T} \right),$$
$$\operatorname{\text{Ш}}_{aT}\left(t\right) = \frac{1}{aT} \operatorname{\text{Ш}}\!\left( \frac{t}{aT} \right) = \frac{1}{a} \operatorname{\text{Ш}}_{T}\!\left(\frac{t}{a}\right).$$
Note that requiring positive scaling numbers $a$ instead of negative ones is not a restriction because the negative sign would only reverse the order of the summation within $\text{Ш}_{T}$, which does not affect the result.

== Fourier series ==
It is clear that $\operatorname{\text{Ш}}_{T}(t)$ is periodic with period $T$. That is,
$$\operatorname{\text{Ш}}_{T}(t + T) = \operatorname{\text{Ш}}_{T}(t)$$
for all $t$. The complex Fourier series for such a periodic function is
$$\operatorname{\text{Ш}}_{T}(t) = \sum_{n=-\infty}^{+\infty} c_n e^{i 2 \pi n {t}/{T}},$$
where (using distribution theory) the Fourier coefficients are
$$\begin{align}
c_n &= \frac{1}{T} \int_{t_0}^{t_0 + T} \operatorname{\text{Ш}}_{T}(t) e^{-i 2 \pi n {t}/{T}}\, dt \quad ( -\infty < t_0 < +\infty ) \\
&= \frac{1}{T} \int_{-{T}/{2}}^{{T}/{2}} \operatorname{\text{Ш}}_{T}(t) e^{-i 2 \pi n {t}/{T}}\, dt \\
&= \frac{1}{T} \int_{-{T}/{2}}^{{T}/{2}} \delta(t) e^{-i 2 \pi n {t}/{T}}\, dt \\
&= \frac{1}{T} e^{-i 2 \pi n \frac{0}{T}} \\
&= \frac{1}{T}.
\end{align}$$

All Fourier coefficients are $1/T$, resulting in
$$\operatorname{\text{Ш}}_{T}(t) = \frac{1}{T}\sum_{n=-\infty}^{\infty} \!\!e^{i 2 \pi n {t}/{T}}.$$

When the period is one unit, this simplifies to
$$\operatorname{\text{Ш}}(x) = \sum_{n=-\infty}^{\infty} \!\!e^{i 2 \pi n x}.$$
This is a divergent series, when understood as a series of ordinary complex numbers, but becomes convergent in the sense of distributions.

A "square root" of the Dirac comb is employed in some applications to physics, specifically:
$$\delta_N^{(1 / 2)}(\xi) = \frac{1}{\sqrt{NT}} \sum_{\nu=0}^{N-1} e^{-i \frac{2\pi}{T}\xi \nu}, \quad
\lim_{N \rightarrow \infty}\left|\delta_N^{(1 / 2)}(\xi)\right|^2= \sum_{k=-\infty}^{\infty} \delta(\xi - kT).$$
However this is not a distribution in the ordinary sense.

== Fourier transform ==
The Fourier transform of a Dirac comb is also a Dirac comb. For the Fourier transform $\mathcal{F}$ expressed in frequency domain (Hz) the Dirac comb $\operatorname{\text{Ш}}_{T}$ of period $T$ transforms into a rescaled Dirac comb of period $1/T$, i.e. for

$$\mathcal{F}\left[ f \right](\xi)= \int_{-\infty}^{\infty} dt f(t) e^{- 2 \pi i\xi t},$$
$$\mathcal{F}\left[ \operatorname{\text{Ш}}_{T} \right](\xi) = \frac{1}{T} \sum_{k=-\infty}^{\infty} \delta(\xi-k \frac{1}{T}) = \frac{1}{T} \operatorname{\text{Ш}}_{\frac{1}{T}}(\xi)$$

is proportional to another Dirac comb, but with period $1/T$ in frequency domain (radian/s). The Dirac comb $\operatorname{\text{Ш}}$ of unit period $T=1$ is thus an eigenfunction of $\mathcal{F}$ to the eigenvalue $1$.

This result can be established by considering the respective Fourier transforms $S_{\tau}(\xi)=\mathcal{F}[s_{\tau}](\xi)$ of the family of functions $s_{\tau}(x)$ defined by

$$s_{\tau}(x) = \tau^{-1} e^{-\pi \tau^2 x^2} \sum_{n=-\infty}^{\infty} e^{-\pi \tau^{-2} ( x-n)^{2} }.$$

Since $s_{\tau}(x)$ is a convergent series of Gaussian functions, and Gaussians transform into Gaussians, each of their respective Fourier transforms $S_\tau(\xi)$ also results in a series of Gaussians, and explicit calculation establishes that

$$S_{\tau}(\xi) = \tau^{-1}  \sum_{m=-\infty}^{\infty}  e^{-\pi \tau^2 m^2} e^{-\pi \tau^{-2} ( \xi-m)^{2} }.$$

The functions $s_{\tau}(x)$ and $S_\tau(\xi)$ are thus each resembling a periodic function consisting of a series of equidistant Gaussian spikes $\tau^{-1} e^{-\pi \tau^{-2} ( x-n)^{2} }$ and $\tau^{-1} e^{-\pi \tau^{-2} ( \xi-m)^{2} }$ whose respective "heights" (pre-factors) are determined by slowly decreasing Gaussian envelope functions which drop to zero at infinity. Note that in the limit $\tau \rightarrow 0$ each Gaussian spike becomes an infinitely sharp Dirac impulse centered respectively at $x=n$ and $\xi=m$ for each respective $n$ and $m$, and hence also all pre-factors $e^{-\pi \tau^2 m^2}$ in $S_{\tau}(\xi)$ eventually become indistinguishable from $e^{-\pi \tau^2 \xi^2}$. Therefore the functions $s_{\tau}(x)$ and their respective Fourier transforms $S_{\tau}(\xi)$ converge to the same function and this limit function is a series of infinite equidistant Gaussian spikes, each spike being multiplied by the same pre-factor of one, i.e., the Dirac comb for unit period:

$\lim_{\tau \rightarrow 0} s_{\tau}(x) = \operatorname{\text{Ш}}({x})$ and $\lim_{\tau \rightarrow 0} S_{\tau}(\xi) = \operatorname{\text{Ш}}({\xi}).$

Since ${{{1}}}$, we obtain in this limit the result to be demonstrated:

$$\mathcal{F}[\operatorname{\text{Ш}}]= \operatorname{\text{Ш}}.$$

The corresponding result for period $T$ can be found by exploiting the scaling property of the Fourier transform,

$$\mathcal{F}[\operatorname{\text{Ш}}_T]= \frac{1}{T} \operatorname{\text{Ш}}_{\frac{1}{T}}.$$

Another manner to establish that the Dirac comb transforms into another Dirac comb starts by examining continuous Fourier transforms of periodic functions in general, and then specialises to the case of the Dirac comb. In order to also show that the specific rule depends on the convention for the Fourier transform, this will be shown using angular frequency with $\omega=2\pi \xi$: for any periodic function $f(t)=f(t+T)$ its Fourier transform

$\mathcal{F}\left[ f \right](\omega)=F(\omega) = \int_{-\infty}^{\infty} dt f(t) e^{-i\omega t}$ obeys:
$$F(\omega) (1 - e^{i \omega T}) = 0$$

because Fourier transforming $f(t)$ and $f(t+T)$ leads to $F(\omega)$ and $F(\omega) e^{i \omega T}$. This equation implies that $F(\omega)=0$ nearly everywhere with the only possible exceptions lying at $\omega = k \omega_0$, with $\omega_0=2\pi / T$ and $k \in \Z$. When evaluating the Fourier transform at $F(k \omega_0)$ the corresponding Fourier series expression times a corresponding delta function results. For the special case of the Fourier transform of the Dirac comb, the Fourier series integral over a single period covers only the Dirac function at the origin and thus gives $1/T$ for each $k$. This can be summarised by interpreting the Dirac comb as a limit of the Dirichlet kernel such that, at the positions $\omega= k \omega_0$, all exponentials in the sum $\sum\nolimits_{m=-\infty}^{\infty} e^{\pm i \omega m T}$ point into the same direction and add constructively. In other words, the continuous Fourier transform of periodic functions leads to

$F(\omega)= 2 \pi \sum_{k=-\infty}^{\infty} c_k \delta(\omega-k\omega_0)$ with $\omega_0=2 \pi/T$,

and

$$c_k = \frac{1}{T} \int_{-T/2 }^{+T/2} dt f(t) e^{-i 2 \pi k t/T}.$$

The Fourier series coefficients $c_k=1/T$ for all $k$ when $f \rightarrow \text{Ш}_{T}$, i.e.

$$\mathcal{F}\left[ \operatorname{\text{Ш}}_{T} \right](\omega) = \frac{2 \pi}{T} \sum_{k=-\infty}^{\infty} \delta(\omega-k \frac{2 \pi}{T})$$

is another Dirac comb, but with period $2 \pi/T$ in angular frequency domain (radian/s).

As mentioned, the specific rule depends on the convention for the used Fourier transform. Indeed, when using the scaling property of the Dirac delta function, the above may be re-expressed in ordinary frequency domain (Hz) and one obtains again:
$$\operatorname{\text{Ш}}_{T}(t) \stackrel{\mathcal{F}}{\longleftrightarrow} \frac{1}{T} \operatorname{\text{Ш}}_{\frac{1}{T}}(\xi) = \sum_{n=-\infty}^{\infty}\!\! e^{-i 2\pi \xi n T},$$
such that the unit period Dirac comb transforms to itself:
$$\operatorname{\text{Ш}}\ \!(t) \stackrel{\mathcal{F}}{\longleftrightarrow} \operatorname{\text{Ш}}\ \!(\xi).$$

Finally, the Dirac comb is also an eigenfunction of the unitary continuous Fourier transform in angular frequency space to the eigenvalue $1$ when $T=\sqrt{2 \pi}$ because for the unitary Fourier transform

$$\mathcal{F}\left[ f \right](\omega)=F(\omega) = \frac{1}{\sqrt{2\pi}}\int_{-\infty}^{\infty} dt f(t) e^{-i\omega t},$$

the above may be re-expressed as
$$\operatorname{\text{Ш}}_{T}(t) \stackrel{\mathcal{F}}{\longleftrightarrow} \frac{\sqrt{2\pi}}{T} \operatorname{\text{Ш}}_{\frac{2\pi}{T}}(\omega) = \frac{1}{\sqrt{2\pi}}\sum_{n=-\infty}^{\infty} \!\!e^{-i\omega nT}.$$

== Sampling and aliasing ==
Multiplying any function by a Dirac comb transforms it into a train of impulses with integrals equal to the value of the function at the nodes of the comb. This operation is frequently used to represent sampling.
$$(\operatorname{\text{Ш}}_{T} x)(t) = \sum_{k=-\infty}^{\infty} \!\! x(t)\delta(t - kT) = \sum_{k=-\infty}^{\infty}\!\! x(kT)\delta(t - kT).$$

Due to the self-transforming property of the Dirac comb and the convolution theorem, this corresponds to convolution with the Dirac comb in the frequency domain.
$$\operatorname{\text{Ш}}_{T} x \ \stackrel{\mathcal{F}}{\longleftrightarrow}\ \frac{1}{T}\operatorname{\text{Ш}}_\frac{1}{T} * X$$

Since convolution with a delta function $\delta(t-kT)$ is equivalent to shifting the function by $kT$, convolution with the Dirac comb corresponds to replication or periodic summation:

$$(\operatorname{\text{Ш}}_{\frac{1}{T}}\! * X)(f) =\! \sum_{k=-\infty}^{\infty} \!\!X\!\left(f - \frac{k}{T}\right)$$

This leads to a natural formulation of the Nyquist–Shannon sampling theorem. If the spectrum of the function $x$ contains no frequencies higher than B (i.e., its spectrum is nonzero only in the interval $(-B, B)$) then samples of the original function at intervals $\tfrac{1}{2B}$ are sufficient to reconstruct the original signal. It suffices to multiply the spectrum of the sampled function by a suitable rectangle function, which is equivalent to applying a brick-wall lowpass filter.

$$\operatorname{\text{Ш}}_{\frac{1}{2B}} x\ \ \stackrel{\mathcal{F}}{\longleftrightarrow}\ \ 2B\, \operatorname{\text{Ш}}_{2B} * X$$
$$\frac{1}{2B}\Pi\left(\frac{f}{2B}\right) (2B \,\operatorname{\text{Ш}}_{2B} * X) = X$$

In time domain, this "multiplication with the rect function" is equivalent to "convolution with the sinc function". Hence, it restores the original function from its samples. This is known as the Whittaker–Shannon interpolation formula.

Remark: Most rigorously, multiplication of the rect function with a generalized function, such as the Dirac comb, fails. This is due to undetermined outcomes of the multiplication product at the interval boundaries. As a workaround, one uses a Lighthill unitary function instead of the rect function. It is smooth at the interval boundaries, hence it yields determined multiplication products everywhere, see Lighthill 1958, p. 62, Theorem 22 for details.

== Use in directional statistics ==
In directional statistics, the Dirac comb of period $2\pi$ is equivalent to a wrapped Dirac delta function and is the analog of the Dirac delta function in linear statistics.

In linear statistics, the random variable $(x)$ is usually distributed over the real-number line, or some subset thereof, and the probability density of $x$ is a function whose domain is the set of real numbers, and whose integral from $-\infty$ to $+\infty$ is unity. In directional statistics, the random variable $(\theta)$ is distributed over the unit circle, and the probability density of $\theta$ is a function whose domain is some interval of the real numbers of length $2\pi$ and whose integral over that interval is unity. Just as the integral of the product of a Dirac delta function with an arbitrary function over the real-number line yields the value of that function at zero, so the integral of the product of a Dirac comb of period $2\pi$ with an arbitrary function of period $2\pi$ over the unit circle yields the value of that function at zero.

== See also ==
- Comb filter
- Frequency comb
- Poisson summation formula
- Theta function
