= Periodic summation =

Sum of a function's values every _P_ offsets

A Fourier transform and 3 variations caused by periodic sampling (at interval T) and/or periodic summation (at interval P) of the underlying time-domain function. Note however that the variations are not classical Fourier transforms.

In mathematics, any integrable function $s(t)$ can be made into a periodic function $s_P(t)$ with period P by summing the translations of the function $s(t)$ by integer multiples of P. This is called periodic summation:

$$s_P(t) = \sum_{n=-\infty}^\infty s(t + nP)$$

The resulting periodic function may not be defined everywhere. When $s_P(t)$ is represented as a Fourier series, the Fourier coefficients are equal to the values of the continuous Fourier transform, $S(f) \triangleq \mathcal{F}\{s(t)\},$ at intervals of $\tfrac{1}{P}$. This follows easily from recognizing that the formula for finding the n^{th} coefficient of the Fourier series for the periodic summation is identical to the formula for the value of the Fourier transform of the original function at $n/P.$ The identity is also a form of the Poisson summation formula.

This implies that the periodic summation of any band-limited function, such as the sinc function, is a sum of a finite number of sine waves, or even just a single sine wave or zero if the period is less than or equal to half the inverse of the upper frequency limit. A periodic summation of a function can be identically zero if the Fourier transform of the function is zero at all multiples of some frequency, but if all periodic summations (that is, with all periods) are zero then the function must be identically zero.

Similarly, a Fourier series whose coefficients are samples of $s(t)$ at constant intervals (T) is equivalent to a periodic summation of $S(f),$ which is known as a discrete-time Fourier transform.

The periodic summation of a Dirac delta function is the Dirac comb. Likewise, the periodic summation of an integrable function is its convolution with the Dirac comb.

== Quotient space as domain ==
If a periodic function is instead represented using the quotient space domain $\mathbb{R}/(P\mathbb{Z})$ then one can write:

$$\varphi_P : \mathbb{R}/(P\mathbb{Z}) \to \mathbb{R}$$
$$\varphi_P(x) = \sum_{\tau\in x} s(\tau) ~ .$$

The arguments of $\varphi_P$ are equivalence classes of real numbers that share the same fractional part when divided by $P$.

== See also ==
- Dirac comb
- Circular convolution
- Discrete-time Fourier transform
