= Circulant matrix =

Square matrix of cyclically shifted rows

In linear algebra, a circulant matrix is a square matrix in which each row is a cyclic shift, by one position, of the row above it. Equivalently, its entries depend only on the difference of the row and column indices modulo the matrix size: if rows and columns are indexed from $0$ to $n-1$, the $(r,s)$ entry equals $c_{(r-s)\bmod n}$, where $(c_0,c_1,\ldots,c_{n-1})$ is a single generating vector. Circulant matrices are a special class of Toeplitz matrices.

Every complex circulant matrix is diagonalized by the discrete Fourier transform (DFT). As a consequence, circulant matrices form a commutative algebra of normal matrices; the eigenvalues of a circulant matrix are the DFT of its generating vector; and matrix–vector products and nonsingular linear systems involving a circulant matrix can be computed with a fast Fourier transform (FFT) in $O(n\log n)$ arithmetic operations. Algebraically, multiplication by a circulant matrix is circular convolution on the cyclic group $\Z/n\Z$.

Circulant matrices arise wherever a linear operation is invariant under cyclic shifts. They can be interpreted analytically as the integral kernel of a convolution operator on the cyclic group $C_n$, and hence appear in signal and image processing with periodic boundary conditions, in discretizations of translation-invariant problems on periodic domains, and in the study of stationary stochastic processes. In orthogonal frequency-division multiplexing, the cyclic prefix prepended to each transmitted block makes the effective channel matrix circulant, so that channel equalization can be carried out separately on each component in the frequency domain.

In cryptography, a circulant matrix is used in the MixColumns step of the Advanced Encryption Standard.

== Definition ==
An $n \times n$ circulant matrix $C$ takes the form
$$C = \begin{bmatrix}
c_0      & c_{n-1} & \cdots  & c_2     & c_1     \\
c_1      & c_0     & c_{n-1} &         & c_2     \\
\vdots   & c_1     & c_0     & \ddots  & \vdots  \\
c_{n-2}  &         & \ddots  & \ddots  & c_{n-1} \\
c_{n-1}  & c_{n-2} & \cdots  & c_1     & c_0     \\
\end{bmatrix}$$
or the transpose of this form (by choice of notation). If each $c_i$ is a $p \times p$ square matrix, then the $np \times np$ matrix $C$ is called a block-circulant matrix.

A circulant matrix is fully specified by one vector, $c$, which appears as the first column (or row) of $C$. The remaining columns (and rows, resp.) of $C$ are each cyclic permutations of the vector $c$ with offset equal to the column (or row, resp.) index, if lines are indexed from $0$ to $n-1$. (Cyclic permutation of rows has the same effect as cyclic permutation of columns.) The last row of $C$ is the vector $c$ shifted by one in reverse.

Different sources define the circulant matrix in different ways, for example as above, or with the vector $c$ corresponding to the first row rather than the first column of the matrix; and possibly with a different direction of shift (which is sometimes called an anti-circulant matrix).

The polynomial $f(x) = c_0 + c_1 x + \dots + c_{n-1} x^{n-1}$ is called the associated polynomial of the matrix $C$.

== Properties ==
=== Eigenvectors and eigenvalues ===
The normalized eigenvectors of a circulant matrix are the Fourier modes, namely,
$$v_j=\frac{1}{\sqrt{n}} \left(1, \omega^j, \omega^{2j}, \ldots, \omega^{(n-1)j}\right)^{T},\quad j = 0, 1, \ldots, n-1,$$
where $\omega=\exp \left(\tfrac{2\pi i}{n}\right)$ is a primitive $n$-th root of unity and $i$ is the imaginary unit.

(This can be understood by realizing that multiplication with a circulant matrix implements a convolution. In Fourier space, convolutions become multiplication. Hence the product of a circulant matrix with a Fourier mode yields a multiple of that Fourier mode, i.e. it is an eigenvector.)

The corresponding eigenvalues are given by
$$\lambda_j = c_0+c_{1} \omega^{-j} + c_{2} \omega^{-2j} + \dots + c_{n-1} \omega^{-(n-1)j},\quad j = 0, 1, \dots, n-1.$$

=== Determinant ===
As a consequence of the explicit formula for the eigenvalues above, the determinant of a circulant matrix can be computed as:
$$\det C = \prod_{j=0}^{n-1} (c_0 + c_{n-1} \omega^j + c_{n-2} \omega^{2j} + \dots + c_1\omega^{(n-1)j}).$$
Since taking the transpose does not change the eigenvalues of a matrix, an equivalent formulation is
$$\det C
= \prod_{j=0}^{n-1} (c_0 + c_1 \omega^j + c_2 \omega^{2j} + \dots + c_{n-1}\omega^{(n-1)j})
= \prod_{j=0}^{n-1} f(\omega^j).$$

=== Rank ===
The rank of a circulant matrix $C$ is equal to $n - d$ where $d$ is the degree of the polynomial $\gcd( f(x), x^n - 1)$.

=== Other properties ===
- Any circulant is a matrix polynomial (namely, the associated polynomial) in the cyclic permutation matrix $P$:
  $$C = c_0 I + c_1 P + c_2 P^2 + \dots + c_{n-1} P^{n-1} = f(P),$$
  where $P$ is given by the companion matrix
  $$P = \begin{bmatrix}
0&0&\cdots&0&1\\
1&0&\cdots&0&0\\
0&\ddots&\ddots&\vdots&\vdots\\
\vdots&\ddots&\ddots&0&0\\
0&\cdots&0&1&0
\end{bmatrix}.$$
- The set of $n \times n$ circulant matrices forms an $n$-dimensional vector space with respect to addition and scalar multiplication. This space can be interpreted as the space of functions on the cyclic group of order $n$, $C_n$, or equivalently as the group ring of $C_n$.
- Circulant matrices form a commutative algebra, since for any two given circulant matrices $A$ and $B$, the sum $A + B$ is circulant, the product $AB$ is circulant, and $AB = BA$.
- For a nonsingular circulant matrix $A$, its inverse $A^{-1}$ is also circulant. For a singular circulant matrix, its Moore–Penrose pseudoinverse $A^+$ is circulant.
- The discrete Fourier transform matrix of order $n$ is defined as by

$$F_n = (f_{jk}) \text{ with } f_{jk} = e^{-2\pi i/n \cdot jk}, \,\text{for } 0 \leq j,k \leq n-1.$$
There are important connections between circulant matrices and the DFT matrices. In fact, it can be shown that
$$C = F_n^{-1}\operatorname{diag}(F_n c) F_n ,$$
where $c$ is the first column of $C$. The eigenvalues of $C$ are given by the product $F_n c$. This product can be readily calculated by a fast Fourier transform.

- Let $p(x)$ be the (monic) characteristic polynomial of an $n \times n$ circulant matrix $C$. Then the scaled derivative $\frac{1}{n}p'(x)$ is the characteristic polynomial of the following $(n-1)\times(n-1)$ submatrix of $C$:
  $$C_{n-1} = \begin{bmatrix}
c_0     & c_{n-1} & \cdots  & c_3     & c_2     \\
c_1     & c_0     & c_{n-1} &         & c_3     \\
\vdots  & c_1     & c_0     & \ddots  & \vdots  \\
c_{n-3} &         & \ddots  & \ddots  & c_{n-1} \\
c_{n-2} & c_{n-3} & \cdots  & c_{1}   & c_0     \\
\end{bmatrix}$$
  (see for the proof).

== Analytic interpretation ==
Circulant matrices can be interpreted geometrically, which explains the connection with the discrete Fourier transform.

Consider vectors in $\R^n$ as functions on the integers with period $n$, (i.e., as periodic bi-infinite sequences: $\dots,a_0,a_1,\dots,a_{n-1},a_0,a_1,\dots$) or equivalently, as functions on the cyclic group of order $n$ (denoted $C_n$ or $\Z/n\Z$) geometrically, on (the vertices of) the regular $n$-gon: this is a discrete analog to periodic functions on the real line or circle.

Then, from the perspective of operator theory, a circulant matrix is the kernel of a discrete integral transform, namely the convolution operator for the function $(c_0,c_1,\dots,c_{n-1})$; this is a discrete circular convolution. The formula for the convolution of the functions $(b_i) := (c_i) * (a_i)$ is

$$b_k = \sum_{i=0}^{n-1} a_i c_{k-i}$$

(recall that the sequences are periodic) which is the product of the vector $(a_i)$ by the circulant matrix for $(c_i)$.

The discrete Fourier transform then converts convolution into multiplication, which in the matrix setting corresponds to diagonalization.

The $C^*$-algebra of all circulant matrices with complex entries is isomorphic to the group $C^*$-algebra of $\Z/n\Z.$

== Relation to stationary processes ==
In statistics and signal processing, circulant matrices arise naturally as the covariance matrices of wide-sense stationary processes observed on a circular array or with periodic boundary conditions. More generally, the covariance matrix of a stationary process on a linear array is Toeplitz, and Toeplitz matrices are asymptotically circulant as the dimension grows. This asymptotic equivalence is the reason that DFT-based spectral analysis is asymptotically optimal for stationary processes: the DFT diagonalizes circulant matrices exactly and approximately diagonalizes Toeplitz matrices, so the DFT coefficients are asymptotically uncorrelated for stationary data.

== Symmetric circulant matrices ==
For a symmetric circulant matrix $C$ one has the extra condition that $c_{n-i}=c_i$. Thus it is determined by $\lfloor n/2\rfloor + 1$ elements.
$$C = \begin{bmatrix}
c_0     & c_1 & \cdots & c_2    & c_1    \\
c_1     & c_0 & c_1    &        & c_2    \\
\vdots  & c_1 & c_0    & \ddots & \vdots \\
c_2     &     & \ddots & \ddots & c_1    \\
c_1     & c_2 & \cdots & c_1    & c_0    \\
\end{bmatrix}.$$

The eigenvalues of any real symmetric matrix are real. The corresponding eigenvalues $\vec{\lambda}= \sqrt n \cdot F_n^{\dagger} c$ become:
$$\begin{array}{lcl} \lambda_k & = & c_0 + c_{n/2} e^{-\pi i \cdot k} + 2\sum_{j=1}^{\frac{n}{2}-1} c_j \cos{(-\frac{2\pi}{n}\cdot k j )} \\
& = & c_0+ c_{n/2} \omega_k^{n/2} + 2 c_1 \Re \omega_k + 2 c_2 \Re \omega_k^2 + \dots + 2c_{n/2-1} \Re \omega_k^{n/2-1} \end{array}$$
for $n$ even, and
$$\begin{array}{lcl} \lambda_k & = & c_0 + 2\sum_{j=1}^{\frac{n-1}{2}} c_j \cos{(-\frac{2\pi}{n}\cdot k j )}  \\
& = & c_0 + 2 c_1 \Re \omega_k + 2 c_2 \Re \omega_k^2 + \dots + 2c_{(n-1)/2} \Re \omega_k^{(n-1)/2} \end{array}$$
for $n$ odd, where $\Re z$ denotes the real part of $z$. This can be further simplified by using the fact that $\Re \omega_k^j = \Re e^{-\frac{2\pi i}{n} \cdot kj} = \cos(-\frac{2\pi}{n} \cdot kj)$ and $\omega_k^{n/2}=e^{-\frac{2\pi i}{n} \cdot k \frac{n}{2}} =e^{-\pi i \cdot k}$ depending on $k$ even or odd.

Symmetric circulant matrices belong to the class of bisymmetric matrices.

== Hermitian circulant matrices ==
The complex version of the circulant matrix, ubiquitous in communications theory, is usually Hermitian. In this case $c_{n-i} = c_i^*, \; i \le n/2$ and its determinant and all eigenvalues are real.

If n is even the first two rows necessarily takes the form
$$\begin{bmatrix}
r_0     & z_1 & z_2 & r_3 & z_2^* & z_1^* \\
z_1^* & r_0     & z_1 & z_2 & r_3 & z_2^*  \\
\dots \\
\end{bmatrix}.$$
in which the first element $r_3$ in the top second half-row is real.

If n is odd we get
$$\begin{bmatrix}
r_0     & z_1 & z_2 & z_2^* & z_1^* \\
z_1^*  & r_0   & z_1 & z_2 & z_2^* \\
\dots\\
\end{bmatrix}.$$

Tee has discussed constraints on the eigenvalues for the Hermitian condition.

== Applications ==
=== In linear equations ===
Given a matrix equation

$$C \mathbf{x} = \mathbf{b},$$

where $C$ is a circulant matrix of size $n$, we can write the equation as the circular convolution
$$\mathbf{c} \star \mathbf{x} = \mathbf{b},$$
where $\mathbf c$ is the first column of $C$, and the vectors $\mathbf c$, $\mathbf x$ and $\mathbf b$ are cyclically extended in each direction. Using the circular convolution theorem, we can use the discrete Fourier transform to transform the cyclic convolution into component-wise multiplication
$$\mathcal{F}_{n}(\mathbf{c} \star \mathbf{x}) = \mathcal{F}_{n}(\mathbf{c}) \mathcal{F}_{n}(\mathbf{x}) = \mathcal{F}_{n}(\mathbf{b})$$
so that
$$\mathbf{x} = \mathcal{F}_n^{-1} \left[ \left(
\frac{(\mathcal{F}_n(\mathbf{b}))_{\nu}}
{(\mathcal{F}_n(\mathbf{c}))_{\nu}}
\right)_{\!\nu\in\Z}\, \right]^{\rm T}.$$

This algorithm is much faster than the standard Gaussian elimination, especially if a fast Fourier transform is used.

=== In graph theory ===
In graph theory, a graph or digraph whose adjacency matrix is circulant is called a circulant graph/digraph. Equivalently, a graph is circulant if its automorphism group contains a full-length cycle. The Möbius ladders are examples of circulant graphs, as are the Paley graphs for fields of prime order.
