= Finite Fourier transform =

In mathematics the finite Fourier transform may refer to:

- another name for discrete-time Fourier transform (DTFT) of a finite-length series. E.g., F.J.Harris (pp. 52–53) describes the finite Fourier transform as a "continuous periodic function" and the discrete Fourier transform (DFT) as "a set of samples of the finite Fourier transform". In actual implementation, that is not two separate steps; the DFT replaces the DTFT. (Note: Harris' motivation for the distinction is to distinguish between an odd-length data sequence with the indices $\left\{-\tfrac{N-1}{2} \le n \le \tfrac{N-1}{2}\right\},$ which he calls the finite Fourier transform data window, and a sequence on $\{0 \le n \le N-1\},$ which is the DFT data window.) So J.Cooley (pp. 77–78) describes the implementation as discrete finite Fourier transform.

or

- another name for the Fourier series coefficients.

or

- another name for one snapshot of a short-time Fourier transform.

== See also ==
- Fourier transform

== Notes ==
3. Harris, Fredric J. (Jan 1978). "On the use of Windows for Harmonic Analysis with the Discrete Fourier Transform" (PDF). Proceedings of the IEEE. 66 (1): 51–83. doi:10.1109/PROC.1978.10837. S2CID 426548.
4. Cooley, J.; Lewis, P.; Welch, P. (1969). "The finite Fourier transform". IEEE Trans. Audio Electroacoustics. 17 (2): 77–85. doi:10.1109/TAU.1969.1162036.
