= Circular convolution =

Mathematical operation

Circular convolution, also known as cyclic convolution, is a special case of periodic convolution, which is the convolution of two periodic functions that have the same period. Periodic convolution arises, for example, in the context of the discrete-time Fourier transform (DTFT). In particular, the DTFT of the product of two discrete sequences is the periodic convolution of the DTFTs of the individual sequences. And each DTFT is a periodic summation of a continuous Fourier transform function (see Discrete-time Fourier transform § Relation to Fourier Transform). Although DTFTs are usually continuous functions of frequency, the concepts of periodic and circular convolution are also directly applicable to discrete sequences of data. In that context, circular convolution plays an important role in maximizing the efficiency of a certain kind of common filtering operation.

== Definitions ==
The periodic convolution of two T-periodic functions, $h_{_T}(t)$ and $x_{_T}(t)$ can be defined as:

$\int_{t_o}^{t_o+T} h_{_T}(\tau)\cdot x_{_T}(t - \tau)\,d\tau,$

where $t_o$ is an arbitrary parameter. An alternative definition, in terms of the notation of normal linear or aperiodic convolution, follows from expressing $h_{_T}(t)$ and $x_{_T}(t)$ as periodic summations of aperiodic components $h$ and $x$, i.e.:

$$h_{_T}(t) \ \triangleq \ \sum_{k=-\infty}^\infty  h(t - kT) = \sum_{k=-\infty}^\infty h(t + kT).$$

Then:

$\int_{t_o}^{t_o+T} h_{_T}(\tau)\cdot x_{_T}(t - \tau)\,d\tau = \int_{-\infty}^\infty h(\tau)\cdot x_{_T}(t - \tau)\,d\tau\ \triangleq\ (h *x_{_T})(t) = (x * h_{_T})(t).$

Eq.1

Derivation of Eq.1

$$\begin{align}
\int_{-\infty}^\infty h(\tau)\cdot x_{_T}(t - \tau)\,d\tau
&=\sum_{k=-\infty}^\infty \left[\int_{t_o+kT}^{t_o+(k+1)T} h(\tau)\cdot x_{_T}(t - \tau)\ d\tau\right] \quad t_0 \text{ is an arbitrary parameter}\\
&=\sum_{k=-\infty}^\infty \left[\int_{t_o}^{t_o+T} h(u + kT)\cdot \underbrace{x_{_T}(t-u-kT)}_{x_{_T}(t-u), \text{ by periodicity}}\ du\right] \quad \text{substituting } u\triangleq \tau-kT\\
&=\int_{t_o}^{t_o+T} \left[\sum_{k=-\infty}^\infty h(u + kT)\cdot x_{_T}(t - u)\right]\ du\\
&=\int_{t_o}^{t_o+T} \underbrace{\left[\sum_{k=-\infty}^\infty h(u + kT)\right]}_{\triangleq \ h_{_T}(u)}\cdot x_{_T}(t - u)\ du\\
&=\int_{t_o}^{t_o+T} h_{_T}(\tau)\cdot x_{_T}(t - \tau)\ d\tau \quad \text{substituting } \tau \triangleq u
\end{align}$$

Both forms can be called periodic convolution. (Note: McGillem and Cooper, p 172 (4-6)) The term circular convolution arises from the important special case of constraining the non-zero portions of both $h$ and $x$ to the interval $[0,T].$ Then the periodic summation becomes a periodic extension (Note: McGillem and Cooper, p 183 (4-51)), which can also be expressed as a circular function:

$x_{_T}(t) = x(t_{\mathrm{mod}\ T}), \quad t\in\mathbb{R}\,$ (any real number) (Note: Oppenheim and Shafer, p 559 (8.59))

And the limits of integration reduce to the length of function $h$:

$(h *x_{_T})(t) = \int_{0}^{T} h(\tau)\cdot x((t - \tau)_{\mathrm{mod}\ T})\ d\tau.$ (Note: Oppenheim and Shafer, p 571 (8.114), shown in digital form) (Note: McGillem and Cooper, p 171 (4-22), shown in digital form)

== Discrete sequences ==
Similarly, for discrete sequences, and a parameter N, we can write a circular convolution of aperiodic functions $h$ and $x$ as:

$$(h * x_{_N})[n] \ \triangleq \ \sum_{m=-\infty}^\infty  h[m] \cdot \underbrace{x_{_N}[n-m]}_{\sum_{k=-\infty}^\infty x[n -m -kN]}$$

This function is N-periodic. It has at most N unique values. For the special case that the non-zero extent of both x and h are ≤ N, it is reducible to matrix multiplication where the kernel of the integral transform is a circulant matrix.

== Example ==
Circular convolution can be expedited by the FFT algorithm, so it is often used with an FIR filter to efficiently compute linear convolutions. These graphs illustrate how that is possible. Note that a larger FFT size (N) would prevent the overlap that causes graph #6 to not quite match all of #3.

A case of great practical interest is illustrated in the figure. The duration of the x sequence is N (or less), and the duration of the h sequence is significantly less. Then many of the values of the circular convolution are identical to values of x∗h, which is actually the desired result when the h sequence is a finite impulse response (FIR) filter. Furthermore, the circular convolution is very efficient to compute, using a fast Fourier transform (FFT) algorithm and the circular convolution theorem.

There are also methods for dealing with an x sequence that is longer than a practical value for N. The sequence is divided into segments (blocks) and processed piecewise. Then the filtered segments are carefully pieced back together. Edge effects are eliminated by overlapping either the input blocks or the output blocks. To help explain and compare the methods, we discuss them both in the context of an h sequence of length 201 and an FFT size of N = 1024.

=== Overlapping input blocks ===
This method uses a block size equal to the FFT size (1024). We describe it first in terms of normal or linear convolution. When a normal convolution is performed on each block, there are start-up and decay transients at the block edges, due to the filter latency (200-samples). Only 824 of the convolution outputs are unaffected by edge effects. The others are discarded, or simply not computed. That would cause gaps in the output if the input blocks are contiguous. The gaps are avoided by overlapping the input blocks by 200 samples. In a sense, 200 elements from each input block are "saved" and carried over to the next block. This method is referred to as overlap-save, although the method we describe next requires a similar "save" with the output samples.

When an FFT is used to compute the 824 unaffected DFT samples, we don't have the option of not computing the affected samples, but the leading and trailing edge-effects are overlapped and added because of circular convolution. Consequently, the 1024-point inverse FFT (IFFT) output contains only 200 samples of edge effects (which are discarded) and the 824 unaffected samples (which are kept). To illustrate this, the fourth frame of the figure at right depicts a block that has been periodically (or "circularly") extended, and the fifth frame depicts the individual components of a linear convolution performed on the entire sequence. The edge effects are where the contributions from the extended blocks overlap the contributions from the original block. The last frame is the composite output, and the section colored green represents the unaffected portion.

=== Overlapping output blocks ===
This method is known as overlap-add. In our example, it uses contiguous input blocks of size 824 and pads each one with 200 zero-valued samples. Then it overlaps and adds the 1024-element output blocks. Nothing is discarded, but 200 values of each output block must be "saved" for the addition with the next block. Both methods advance only 824 samples per 1024-point IFFT, but overlap-save avoids the initial zero-padding and final addition.

== See also ==
- Convolution theorem
- Circulant matrix
- Discrete Hilbert transform

== Page citations ==
5. Oppenheim, Alan V.; Schafer, Ronald W.; Buck, John R. (1999). Discrete-time signal processing (2nd ed.). Upper Saddle River, N.J.: Prentice Hall. pp. 548, 571. ISBN 0-13-754920-2.
6. McGillem, Clare D.; Cooper, George R. (1984). Continuous and Discrete Signal and System Analysis (2 ed.). Holt, Rinehart and Winston. ISBN 0-03-061703-0.
