= Camps =

Camps may refer to:

== People ==
- Ramón Camps (1927–1994), Argentine general
- Gabriel Camps (1927–2002), French historian
- Luís Espinal Camps (1932–1980), Spanish missionary to Bolivia
- Victoria Camps (b. 1941), Spanish philosopher and professor
- Josep Piqué i Camps (b. 1955), Spanish politician
- Octavia Camps, Uruguayan-American computer scientist
- Francisco Camps (b. 1962), Spanish politician
- Gerardo Camps, (b. 1963), Spanish politician
- Patricio Camps (b. 1972), Argentine footballer

== Places ==
In Argentina:

- Estación Camps, village in Entre Ríos Province

In France:

- Camps-sur-l'Agly, commune in the Aude department
- Camps-en-Amiénois, commune in the Somme department
- Camps-la-Source, commune in the Var department
- Camps-sur-l'Isle, commune in the Gironde department
- Camps-Saint-Mathurin-Léobazel, commune in the Corrèze department

In Spain:

- Camps, Fonollosa, singular population entity in Fonollosa, Spain

== See also ==
- CAMPS, missile defense system for civilian aircraft
- Camp (disambiguation)
- Campus
- Kamps (disambiguation)
- Kempes
