= Octavia =

Octavia may refer to:

== People ==
- Octavia (given name)

=== Ancient Rome ===
- Octavia the Elder (before 66 – after 29 BC), elder half sister of Octavia the Younger and Augustus/Octavian
- Octavia the Younger (c.66–11 BC), sister of Augustus, younger half sister of Octavia the Elder and fourth wife of Mark Antony.
- Claudia Octavia (AD 39–AD 62), daughter of Claudius and Valeria Messalina and first wife of Nero

=== Post-Ancient Rome ===
- Octavia Hill (1838–1912), English social reformer and founder of the National Trust.
- Octavia (early 20th century), the name taken by Mabel Barltrop of the Panacea Society in 1918
- Octahvia (fl. 1980s), American vocalist
- Octavia E. Butler (1947–2006), African-American science fiction writer
- Octavia Hall Smillie (1889–1970), American dietitian
- Oktawia Kawęcka (born 1985), jazz musician, singer, flutist, composer, producer and actress
- Octavia Spencer (born 1972), actress

== Culture ==
- Octavia (play), a tragedy mistakenly attributed to the Roman playwright Seneca the Younger that dramatises Claudia Octavia's death
- Octavia (opera), by Reinhard Keiser
- Octavia (novel), a 1977 novel by Jilly Cooper
- Octavia (film), a 1984 American film

== Fictional characters ==
- Octavia (She-Ra), a character from the animated series She-Ra: Princess of Power by Larry DiTillio and J. Michael Straczynski and She-Ra and the Princesses of Power by ND Stevenson
- Octavia of the Julii, a character in HBO's television series Rome loosely based on Octavia Minor
- Octavia, Kielian snake in the book series Guardians of Ga'Hoole by Kathryn Lasky
- Octavia Blake, a character portrayed in the book series The 100 by Kass Morgan
  - Octavia Blake, a character in the television adaptation of Morgan's series, The 100, by Jason Rothenberg
- Octavia Melody, a character from My Little Pony: Friendship Is Magic
- Octavia, a character in the adult animated web-series Helluva Boss
- Agent Octavia, a character from Odd Squad

== Others ==
- Octavia (gens), a clan which the Roman emperor Augustus, his family and his male-line ancestors originated from
- Octavia (restaurant), a restaurant in San Francisco, California
- Škoda Octavia, the name of mid-size family car introduced by the Czech automobile manufacturer Škoda Auto
- Octavia Sperati, a doom metal band
- Octavia Boulevard, a street in San Francisco, California
- Octavia (band), a Bolivian band
- "Octavia", a song by Bruce Dickinson from the album Skunkworks
- 598 Octavia, an asteroid
- Octavia (effects pedal), developed originally for Jimi Hendrix
- Octavia, Nebraska, a village in Nebraska, USA
- Octavia, Oklahoma
- Octavia (plant genus), a former plant genus in the family Rubiaceae
- HMS Octavia
