= CAMP =

CAMP, cAMP or camP may stand for:

- CAMP:
  - Cathelicidin, or Cathelicidin antimicrobial peptide
  - Campaign Against Marijuana Planting
  - CAMP, part of the Prague Institute of Planning and Development
  - Central Atlantic magmatic province
  - CAMP (company), an Italian manufacturer of climbing equipment
  - CAMP (studio), a media studio in Mumbai
  - CAMP factor, a substance that enhances hemolysis by the beta-toxin of Staphylococcus aureus
- cAMP:
  - Cyclic adenosine monophosphate (cAMP)
  - (+)-cis-2-Aminomethylcyclopropane carboxylic acid, a GABA_{A}-ρ agonist
- camP:
  - 2,5-diketocamphane 1,2-monooxygenase, an enzyme

== See also ==
- Camp (disambiguation)
- Camping (disambiguation)
