= Rentzsch =

Rentzsch is a surname. Notable people with the surname Rentzsch include:

- Matthias Rentzsch (born 1977), German politician
- Hermann Rentzsch (1913–1978), German general
- Inga Kamp (born 1970, née Rentzsch-Holm), German astronomer
