= Câmpu Mare =

Câmpu Mare may refer to several villages in Romania:

- Câmpu Mare, a village in Scoarța Commune, Gorj County
- Câmpu Mare, a village in Bala, Mehedinți
- Câmpu Mare, a village in Dobroteasa Commune, Olt County

== See also ==
- Câmpia (disambiguation)
- Câmpeni (disambiguation)
- Câmpulung (disambiguation)
- Câmpu River (disambiguation)
