= War camp =

War camp, warcamp, or, variation, may refer to:

- military camp, a camp for a military force in preparation for war
- training camp for military recruit training, a camp to train people to become warriors
- prisoner-of-war camp, a camp for containing combatants taken prisoner in battle
- Warcamp, Lagos, Nigeria; see Architecture of Lagos
- War Camp, Iju, Ogun, Nigeria
- War Camp Community Services (WCCS), former name of The National Recreation Foundation

== See also ==
- War (disambiguation)
- Camp (disambiguation)
- Quilombo (disambiguation) (Kimbundu for 'warcamp')
- Eko (disambiguation) (Yoruba for 'warcamp')
- Battle camp (disambiguation)
- boot camp (disambiguation)
- Combat Camp (disambiguation)
