= Camping Out =

Camping Out may refer to:

- Camping
- Camping Out (film), a 1919 short film directed by and starring Fatty Arbuckle
- Camping Out, a 1934 animated short film starring Mickey Mouse

== See also ==
- Camping (disambiguation)
