= Combat camp =

Combat camp or variant, may refer to:

- Military camp, a camp for a military force in preparation for combat
- Training camp, a camp for educational, sports, correctional activities involving aerobic, training, fitness, and sports activities
- Training camp for military recruit training, a camp to train people to become warriors
- "Combat Camp", an episode of Amphibia

== See also ==
- Combat (disambiguation)
- Camp (disambiguation)
- War camp (disambiguation)
- Battle camp (disambiguation)
- Boot camp (disambiguation)
