= Battle camp =

Battle camp or variant, may refer to:

- military camp, a camp for a military force in preparation for battle
- training camp for military recruit training, a camp to train people to become warriors
- Battle Camp, a locality on the Palmer River on Cape York in Queensland, Australia
- Battle Camp, Cairns, Queensland, Australia
- Battle Camp Sandstones, a region of the Cape York Peninsula tropical savanna, Queensland, Australia
- Battlecamp Road, Hope Vale, Queensland, Australia
- Battle Camp, Netflix reality television series

== See also ==
- Battle (disambiguation)
- Camp (disambiguation)
- War camp (disambiguation)
- boot camp (disambiguation)
- Combat Camp (disambiguation)
- Quilombo (disambiguation) (Kimbundu for 'warcamp, battlecamp')
- Eko (disambiguation) (Yoruba for 'warcamp, battlecamp')
