= Câmpeni (disambiguation) =

Câmpeni may refer to several places in Romania:

- Câmpeni, a town in Alba County
- Câmpeni, a village in Pârjol Commune, Bacău County
- Câmpeni, a village in Prăjeni Commune, Botoșani County
- Câmpeni, a village in Amaru Commune, Buzău County
- Câmpeni, a village in Pielești Commune, Dolj County

and to:

- Alexanderfeld (formerly Alexandru cel Bun or Cîmpeni), a commune in Cahul district, Moldova

== See also ==
- Câmpia (disambiguation)
- Câmpulung (disambiguation)
- Câmpu River (disambiguation)
- Câmpu Mare (disambiguation)
