= Line E (Prague Metro) =

Proposed metro line in Prague, Czech Republic

- Line E marking in the colour used on IPR's preliminary route map

Overview
- Status: Proposed (feasibility study in progress)
- Locale: Prague, Czech Republic
- Termini: Nádraží Smíchov (preliminary); Terminál Sever (preliminary)
- Stations: 8 (preliminary)

Service
- Type: Rapid transit
- System: Prague Metro

Technical
- Line length: approx. 22 km (14 mi)

Line E (Czech: Linka E), also referred to as Metro O or officially as the "new tangential line", is a proposed fifth line of the Prague Metro. Unlike the existing lines, which run radially from the outskirts through the city centre, Line E would form a tangential, partly circular route connecting the other lines outside the historic centre. As of September 2026, the route, the location of interchange stations and the transport technology are subject to a feasibility study.

== History ==
The idea of a line connecting parts of Prague outside the centre dates back to the 1980s, when a preliminary route was defined by Metroprojekt, at a time when planners expected the city to grow mainly in its eastern sector. In 2021 the Prague Institute of Planning and Development (IPR) included a reserve for the line in the new land-use plan (Metropolitní plán), and in June 2023 the governing coalition of the city council supported the tangential route in a resolution. The city council had already discussed a tender for a study of a fifth, circular metro line in 2022, when the project was referred to as Metro O.

On 7 September 2026 the Prague City Council approved the commissioning of a feasibility study, which is coordinated and partly prepared by IPR and is expected to take about one and a half years. The study is also to examine whether Line D should terminate at Náměstí Republiky or continue to Žižkov, where it could connect with Line E.

== Route ==
According to the preliminary route published by IPR, Line E would run from Nádraží Smíchov through Pankrác/Budějovická, Eden, Želivského, Nádraží Libeň, Vysočanská and Letňany to Terminál Sever, a planned terminal in Letňany connected to the future high-speed railway. The line would connect with Line A at Želivského, Line B at Nádraží Smíchov and Vysočanská, Line C at Budějovická and Letňany, and Line D at Pankrác, which could become an interchange between three lines. The exact location of some interchanges, such as Pankrác or Budějovická and Želivského or Ohrada, has not been decided.

== Technology and costs ==
The feasibility study is to compare three technologies: a surface rapid tram, a rubber-tyred hybrid system, and a conventional underground metro. The line would be about 22 kilometres (14 mi) long and could partly run above ground to reduce costs; according to deputy mayor for transport Jaromír Beránek, it could be used by almost 900,000 passengers per day. Beránek stated that a journey between Bohdalec and Žižkov freight station would take about 3.5 minutes instead of the current 25 minutes with a transfer. The cost of a line built in conventional tunnels has been estimated at around 220 billion CZK.
