= Câmpia =

Câmpia may refer to several villages in Romania:

- Câmpia, a village in Socol Commune, Caraş-Severin County
- Câmpia, a village in Bocşa commune, Sălaj County

== See also ==
- Câmpeni (disambiguation)
- Câmpulung (disambiguation)
- Câmpu River (disambiguation)
- Câmpu Mare (disambiguation)
