= Câmpulung (disambiguation) =

Câmpulung, also spelled Cîmpulung, can refer to these places in Romania:

- Câmpulung or Câmpulung Muscel, a town in Argeș County
- Câmpulung Moldovenesc, a town in Suceava County
- Câmpulung la Tisa, a commune in Maramureș County
- Câmpulung County, a former administrative subdivision of Romania

== See also ==
- Câmpia (disambiguation)
- Câmpeni (disambiguation)
- Câmpu River (disambiguation)
- Câmpu Mare (disambiguation)
