= Kamps =

Kamps, a Dutch and German family name, can refer to:

- Bob Kamps (1931–2005), American rock climber
- Uwe Kamps (b. 1964), German football goalkeeper
- John Kamps (b. c. 1965), American screenwriter
- Haje Jan Kamps (b. 1981), Dutch photography writer
- Gülcan Kamps (b. 1982), German TV presenter
- Joeri de Kamps (b. 1992), Dutch football midfielder

== See also ==
- Kamp (surname)
- Camps (disambiguation)
- Kempes
