= Kamp =

Kamp or KAMP may refer to:

== Geography ==
- Kamp (river), Austria
- Kamp (Bad Doberan), a park in the German town of Bad Doberan
- Kamp, a district of the German municipality Kamp-Bornhofen
- Kamp, a district of the German municipality Kamp-Lintfort
- Kamp Mound Site, Illinois, United States

== American radio stations ==
- KAMP-LP, a low-power radio station licensed to St. Michael, Alaska
- KAMP (University of Arizona), a student-run radio station in Tucson, Arizona
- KNX-FM, a radio station licensed to Los Angeles, California, formerly KAMP (2009) and KAMP-FM (2009–2021)
- KAMP (AM), a sports radio station licensed to Aurora, Colorado, and serving the Denver metropolitan area

== Other uses ==
- Kamp (surname)
- Hotel Kämp, Helsinki, Finland
- Kamp Store, Kampsville, Illinois, United States, on the National Register of Historic Places
- Kutaisi Auto Mechanical Plant (KAMP), Kutaisi, Georgia
