= Octavia (given name) =

- Gender: Feminine

Origin
- Origin: Latin
- Meaning: eight

Octavia is a feminine given name of Latin origin meaning eight that derives from the Octavia gens.

== Usage ==
It has seen steady use in the United States, where it has ranked among the one thousand most popular names for girls between 1880 and 1937 and then again at different times between 1971 and 1999 and between 2017 and 2022. It was the 248th most popular name for American girls in 2021, more popular than at any other time. The name ranked among the 1,000 most popular names for newborn girls in England and Wales in 1998 and 1999 and again between 2015 and 2021. It ranked among the top 200 names for newborn girls in Canada in 2021, placing 197th on the popularity chart for that year. It has ranked among the top 500 names for newborn girls in France since 2019.

== People ==
- Octavia the Elder (c. Before 69 B-After 29 BC), Ancient Roman noble woman
- Octavia the Younger (c. 66 BC-11 BC), Ancient Roman noble woman
- Claudia Octavia (late 39 or early 40-June 9, AD 62), Roman empress
- Octavia Williams Bates (1846–1911), American women's rights suffragist, clubwoman, and author
- Octavia Blue (born 1976), American former professional women's basketball player and head coach of the Kennesaw State Owls women's basketball team
- Octavia Bright (born 1986), English writer and broadcaster
- Jane Octavia Brookfield (1821–1896), English literary hostess and writer
- Octavia Broske (1886–1967), American actress and musical performer
- Octavia E. Butler (1947–2006), American science fiction author and a multiple recipient of the Hugo and Nebula awards
- Octavia Camps, Uruguayan-American computer scientist
- Octavia Carlén (1828–1881), Swedish writer
- Octavia Cook (born 1978), New Zealand jeweler
- Octavia Hill (1838–1912), English social reformer
- Octavia Lambertis, American singer known professionally as Octahvia
- Octavia Walton Le Vert (1810–1877), American socialite and writer
- Emma Octavia Lundberg (1881–1954), Swedish-American child welfare advocate
- Octavia Nasr (born 1966), Lebanese-American academic, author, and former journalist
- Octavia Ritchie (1868–1948), Canadian physician and women's rights suffragist
- Octavia Spencer (born 1970), American actress
- Octavia Sperati (1847–1918), Norwegian actress
- Octavia St. Laurent (1964–2009), American model and AIDS educator
- Octavia Waldo (born 1929), American writer and artist
- Octavia Yati (born 1954), Indonesian actress
