= Camper (surname) =

Camper is a surname. Notable people with the surname include:

- Adriaan Gilles Camper (1759–1820), Dutch mathematics and physics professor
- Cam Camper (born 2001), American football player
- Cardell Camper (1952–2010), American baseball player
- Carter Camper (born 1988), American ice hockey player
- Cathy Camper (born 1956), Arab-American artist, librarian and author
- Cayden Camper (fl. from 2019), American football player
- Darhyl Camper (born 1990), also known by his stage name Camper, American singer-songwriter
- Frank Camper (born 1946), American veteran, mercenary, and writer
- Jennifer Camper (fl. from 1980s), Lebanese-American graphic artist
- John E. T. Camper (1897 – 1977), American physician and Civil Rights activist
- Loes Camper (born 1958), Dutch footballer
- Karen Camper (born 1958), American politician
- Manny Camper (born 1999), American basketball player
- Petrus Camper (1722–1789), Dutch anatomist
- Willie Camper (1924–1943), American giant

== See also ==
- Kamper, a surname
