= Boot camp =

Boot camp may refer to:

== Training programs ==
- Boot camp (correctional), a type of correctional facility for adolescents, especially in the U.S. penal system
- Boot camp, a training camp for learning various types of skills
  - Military recruit training
  - Fitness boot camp, a type of physical training program
  - Coding bootcamp, bootcamp for teaching programming skills
  - Dev Bootcamp, a defunct computer programming technical school

== In arts, entertainment, and media ==
=== Literature ===
- Boot Camp (Muchamore novel), by Robert Muchamore
- Boot Camp (novel), by Todd Strasser

=== Music ===
- Bootcamp (band), a 1980s band
- Boot Camp (album), from Lil Soldiers
- "Boot Camp", a track featured on the 1996 Soundgarden album, Down on the Upside

=== Television ===
- Boot Camp (TV series), a 2001 reality television show
- Boot camp, a stage of competition on the TV series The X Factor

=== Other uses in arts, entertainment, and media ===
- Boot Camp (film), also known as Straight Edge
- Combat School, a Konami video game released in North America as "Boot Camp"

== Brands and enterprises ==
- Boot Camp (software), Apple software for installing an alternative operating system on an Intel-based Macintosh computer
- Billy's Bootcamp, military inspired exercise program by Billy Blanks

== See also ==
- Boot (disambiguation)
- Camp (disambiguation)
- Battle camp (disambiguation)
- Combat Camp (disambiguation)
- War camp (disambiguation)
