= Camper =

Camper or campers may refer to:

- a person who engages in recreational camping
- a recreational vehicle used for camping
- Camper trailer, another term for a caravan trailer to sleep or live in
- Camper (surname), including a list of people with the name
- Camper (company), a Spanish shoe company
- Camping (video games), a tactic in gaming
- Die Camper ('The Campers'), German TV series
- Camper (lithograph), a 1972 work by Ralph Goings

== See also ==
- Camp (disambiguation)
- Kamper, a surname
- Fascia of Camper, part of the anterior abdominal wall
- Camper Van Beethoven, an American alternative rock band
  - Camper Vantiquities, a 1993 compilation album
