= Quilombo (disambiguation) =

Quilombo is a kind of hinterland settlement founded by slaves (or ex-slaves and their descendants) in Brazil; named from the Kimbundu term for warcamp.

Quilombo may also refer to:

== Places ==
- Quilombo dos Palmares, a former Quilombo in Alagoas State, Brazil
- Quilombo, Santa Catarina, a city in Santa Catarina, Brazil
- Kakonda, a traditional independent kingdom in Angola

=== Rivers ===
- Quilombo River (Moji-Guaçu River tributary), a tributary of the Moji-Guaçu River in São Paulo State, Brazil
- Quilombo River (Juquiá River tributary), a tributary of the Juquiá River in São Paulo State, Brazil

== Arts and entertainment ==
- Quilombo (film), a 1984 Brazilian film, directed by Carlos Diegues
- ¡Quilombo!, the debut album of Steroid Maximus
- "Quilombo", a song by Soulfly on their self-titled debut album

== See also ==
- Military camp (Kimbundu: quilombo, kilombo)
- Quilombola, a resident of a Brazilian quilombo
- Chiasmocleis quilombola (C. quilombola), a species of frog from Brazil
- Battle camp (disambiguation)
- War camp (disambiguation)
