= Kamp (surname) =

Kamp is a Dutch and Low German surname. With the meaning "camp" (for any isolated cultivated piece of land) it can be toponymic of origin, but the name also originated as a patronymic, from the Germanic given name Kampe ("warrior; combatant"). Other, less common origins have also been documented. Notable people with the surname include:

- Alexander Kamp (born 1993), Danish racing cyclist
- Alexandra Kamp (born 1966), German model and actress
- Christine Kamp (born 1966), Dutch organist and pianist
- David Kamp (born 1982), German composer and sound designer
- Hans Kamp (born 1940), Dutch philosopher and linguist
- Harper Kamp (born 1980), American basketball player in Europe
- Heinrich Kamp (1786–1853), German industrialist
- Henk Kamp (born 1952), Dutch VVD politician, Government Minister from 2010 to 2017
- Inga Kamp (born 1970), German astronomer
- Ike Kamp (1900–1955), American baseball pitcher
- Jens Kamp (1845–1900), Danish folklorist
- Jim Kamp (1907–1953), American football offensive lineman
- Joseph P. Kamp (1900–1993), American political activist
- Karl-Heinz Kamp (born 1946), German football player and coach
- Mischa Kamp (born 1970), Dutch film director
- Norbert Kamp (1927–1999), German historian and university president
- Poul-Henning Kamp (born 1966), Danish computer software developer
- Ragnar Kamp (born 1953), Swedish-American curler
- Randy Kamp (born 1953), Canadian Conservative politician
- Ted Russell Kamp (born 1970s), American country singer-songwriter

== See also ==
- Van de Kamp, or Van der Kamp, surname
- Merete Van Kamp (born 1961), Danish model and actress
- Kamps, surname of the same origin
- Kampf (surname), German surname meaning "camp"
