= Camping (disambiguation) =

Camping is a recreational activity.

Camping may also refer to:

== Activities ==
- Summer camping, an American children's activity
- Backpacking (hiking), hiking and camping overnight in backcountry

== Entertainment and media ==
=== Films ===
- Camping (1917 film), an American silent film with Victor Moore
- Camping (1978 film), a Dutch film by Thijs Chanowski
- Camping (1990 film), a Danish film with Søren Pilmark, Per Pallesen and Rolv Wesenlund
- Camping (2006 film), a French film by Fabien Onteniente
- Camping (2009 film), a Danish film with Mia Lyhne and Kirsten Lehfeldt

=== Games ===
- Camping (game), a team ball game played in medieval England, a forerunner of football
- Camping (video games), staying in one spot with a tactical advantage in a computer or video game

=== Music ===
- "Camping", a song included on the CD Disney Children's Favorite Songs 4

=== Television ===
- Camping (British TV series)
- Camping (American TV series)
- "Camping" (Bluey), a 2019 episode
- "Camping" (Not Going Out), a 2012 episode
- "Camping" (Parks and Recreation), a 2011 episode
- "Camping", a 1998 episode of Teletubbies
- "Camping", a 2010 episode of Pocoyo

== People ==
- Harold Camping (1921–2013), Christian radio preacher

== Places ==
- Camping, used in most European countries as a loanword to mean campsite

== Telecommunications ==
- A feature on a private branch exchange telephone system

== See also ==
- Camp (disambiguation)
- CAMP (disambiguation)
- Camper (disambiguation)
