= Kamper =

Kamper is a surname. Notable people with the surname include:

- Ana María Kámper, Colombian dancer, artist and actress of stage, screen and television
- Gabriele Kämper (born 1960), German literary scholar and head of the Equality Office of the Berlin Senate.
- Gerard Kamper (1950–2026), Dutch cyclist
- John H. Kamper (1857–1933), member of the Wisconsin State Assembly
- Jonas Kamper (born 1983), Danish footballer
- Louis Kamper (1861–1953), American architect
- Olívia Kamper (born 1985), Hungarian handballer
- Steve Kamper, Australian politician

== See also ==
- Kamper Bas, a hill and a neighborhood at Gokstad in Sandefjord, Norway
- Camper (disambiguation)
