= 2,5-diketocamphane 1,2-monooxygenase =

Class of enzymes

Identifiers
- EC no.: 1.14.14.108

Databases
- IntEnz: IntEnz view
- BRENDA: BRENDA entry
- ExPASy: NiceZyme view
- KEGG: KEGG entry
- MetaCyc: metabolic pathway
- PRIAM: profile
- PDB structures: RCSB PDB PDBe PDBsum
Search
- PMC: articles
- PubMed: articles
- NCBI: proteins

2,5-diketocamphane 1,2-monooxygenase (EC 1.14.14.108, 2,5-diketocamphane lactonizing enzyme, ketolactonase I, 2,5-diketocamphane 1,2-monooxygenase oxygenating component, 2,5-DKCMO, camphor 1,2-monooxygenase, camphor ketolactonase I) is an enzyme with systematic name (+)-bornane-2,5-dione,NADH:oxygen oxidoreductase (1,2-lactonizing). This enzyme catalyses the following chemical reaction

(+)-bornane-2,5-dione + O_{2} + NADH + H^{+} $\rightleftharpoons$ (+)-5-oxo-1,2-campholide + NAD^{+} + H_{2}O

2,5-diketocamphane 1,2-monooxygenase is a flavoprotein (FMN) which requires Fe^{2+}.
