= The Camp =

The Camp may refer to:

== Geography ==
- The Camp, Gloucestershire, a village in Gloucestershire, United Kingdom
- The Camp, an area of St Albans, Hertfordshire, United Kingdom
- The Camp, California, a former name of Greenwater, California

== Other uses ==
- The Camp (film), a 2013 documentary film
- The Camp (play), a 1778 play by Richard Brinsley Sheridan
- "The Camp" (The Outer Limits), season 3 episode 7 of The Outer Limits
- The Camp (Naturism), the first naturist club to be established in the United Kingdom

== See also ==
- Camp (disambiguation)
