= Kamper Bas =

Hill and neighborhood in Sandefjord, Norway

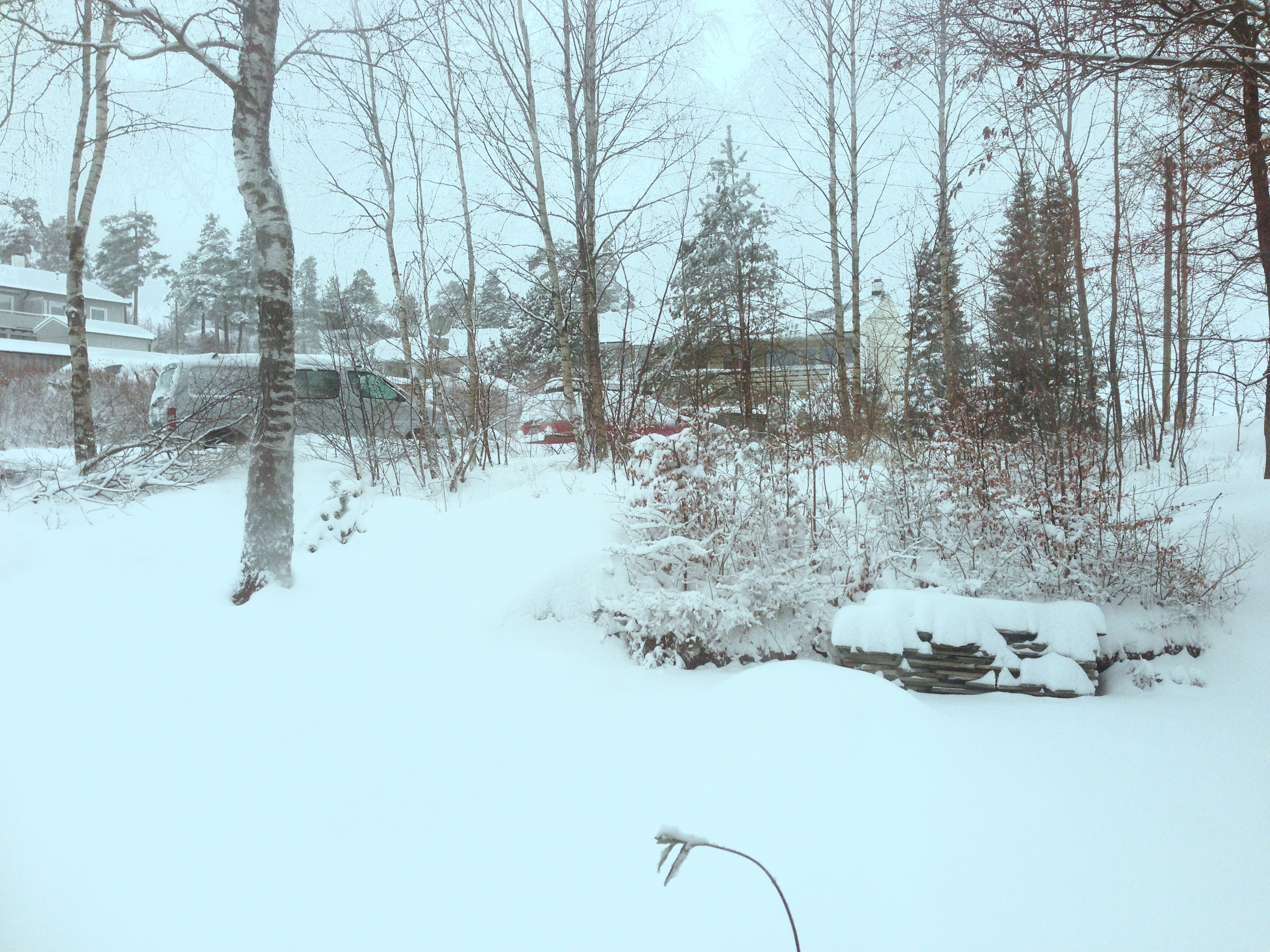
Kamper Bas

Kamper Bas is a hill and a neighborhood at Gokstad in Sandefjord Municipality, Norway. The residential area is located 10–15 minutes walking from the center of the town of Sandefjord. It is located east of Sandefjord city center. Kamper Bas borders Østerøyveien, Hegnaveien, Breiliveien and Gokstadryggen, which is a neighboring residential community. It was formerly known as Kampen Bas and was also known by the name Hjalmarskogen before construction began. It was an undeveloped and forested area used for recreation prior to development. From Kamper Bas are views of Gokstadveien, Unneberg and Kråkås in the north, Freberg and Gjekstad in the east, and Breiliveien, Hegnaveien and Kamfjord in the south.

The origin of the name is unknown, but may be of Old Norse, Dutch or French origin. Kamper Bas was formerly a part of the agricultural Øvre Gokstad farms. Kamper Bas now lies adjacent to Upper Gokstad Farm (“Øvre Gokstad Gård”), which has been in the Bettum family’s possessions since the 1800s.

Fjellmot (49 m., 160 ft.) is the highest peak on Kamper Bas. Fjellmot is a mountain situated in-between Gokstadryggen and Kamper Bas. Kamper Bas may be reached from neighboring Gokstadryggen, Hegnabakken or by a path at the end of Mikkelsbakken leading to Heimdalsveien by the Gokstad ship burial mound.

== Etymology ==
The name’s origin is not known although there are many theories. It has been claimed to be of Old Norse, Dutch, French, and English origin. Local historian Lars Os claimed the name referred to Norse mythology where Bas translates into Baldr while Kamper means mountain (“fjellkolle”), meaning the name derived from Balder's mountain. Several nearby hills have names derived from Norse mythology, including Dronninga at Freberg, which derives from Freyja's mountain. In the Old Norse language, the word “kamp” has had several meanings, including “fight” and “mountain.” The word “camp” appears in several languages, and in Latin, the word “campus” translates to camp. The Latin word “basis” appears in several languages and may translate to "foundation" or "pedestal." Professor Kristian Strømøy has argued that the name may derive from French and translate to “lower camp” or “lower field.” Captain Halbert Mikkelsen, who along with Lars Os lived in the Kamper Bas area, claimed the name was English and derived from “the camping base.” He believed the area had been a place where Vikings camped while their ships were rigged. As Sandefjord was visited by Dutch ships in the Middle Ages, others have claimed the name to be of Dutch origin.

== History ==
Despite local opposition, Kamper Bas was sold to investors in 1968 with the purpose of building a new residential community. Most construction here took place in the 1980s.

In the early 1960s, Kamper Bas was one of several alternative sites considered for the Gokstad Elementary School. Sverre Jensen suggested building the new Gokstad Elementary School on Kamper Bas in 1961, which was approved unanimously. Sandar Helseråd later advised the municipality to not construct the school here, due to its hilly geography and difficult traffic conditions. The decision was later reversed in 1962, and the new school was instead constructed at Uranienborgveien.

== See also ==
- Sandar Municipality
