= Octavia Camps =

Uruguayan-American computer scientist

Octavia Irma Camps is an Uruguayan-American computer scientist specializing in computer vision, including the use of automated video surveillance and passenger screening technology for airport security. She is a professor of electrical and computer engineering in the Northeastern University College of Engineering in Boston.

== Education and career ==
Camps earned bachelor's degrees in both computer science and electrical engineering at the University of the Republic (Uruguay), in 1981 and 1984 respectively. She moved to the US for graduate study at the University of Washington, where she earned a master's degree in electrical engineering in 1987 and a Ph.D. in 1992. Her doctoral dissertation, PREMIO: The Use of Prediction in a CAD-Model-Based Vision System, was supervised by Linda Shapiro.

She became a faculty member at Pennsylvania State University in 1991, working in the departments of electrical engineering and computer science and engineering there. In 2006 she moved to her present position at Northeastern University.
