= Campy (disambiguation) =

Campy most commonly refers to Camp (style).

It is also a nickname for:

People:

- Bert Campaneris (born 1942), American retired Major League Baseball player
- Roy Campanella (1921–1993), American Hall-of-Fame Major League Baseball catcher
- Campy Russell (born 1952), American retired National Basketball Association player
- Lee Camp (footballer) (born 1984), English-born Northern Ireland footballer
- Lee Camp (comedian) (born 1980), American comedian, writer, podcaster, news journalist and news commentator

Other:

- Campagnolo, Italian manufacturer of bicycle components
- Campylobacter, a genus of bacteria
