= Camphor 1,2-monooxygenase =

Class of enzymes

camphor 1,2-monooxygenase

Identifiers
- EC no.: 1.14.15.2
- CAS no.: 37256-81-8

Databases
- IntEnz: IntEnz view
- BRENDA: BRENDA entry
- ExPASy: NiceZyme view
- KEGG: KEGG entry
- MetaCyc: metabolic pathway
- PRIAM: profile
- PDB structures: RCSB PDB PDBe PDBsum
- Gene Ontology: AmiGO / QuickGO
Search
- PMC: articles
- PubMed: articles
- NCBI: proteins

In enzymology, a camphor 1,2-monooxygenase (EC 1.14.15.2) is an enzyme that catalyzes the chemical reaction

(+)-bornane-2,5-dione + reduced rubredoxin + O_{2} $\rightleftharpoons$ 5-oxo-1,2-campholide + oxidized rubredoxin + H_{2}O

The 3 substrates of this enzyme are (+)-bornane-2,5-dione, reduced rubredoxin, and O_{2}, whereas its 3 products are 5-oxo-1,2-campholide, oxidized rubredoxin, and H_{2}O.

This enzyme belongs to the family of oxidoreductases, specifically those acting on paired donors, with O2 as oxidant and incorporation or reduction of oxygen. The oxygen incorporated need not be derived from O2 with reduced iron-sulfur protein as one donor, and incorporation o one atom of oxygen into the other donor. The systematic name of this enzyme class is (+)-camphor,reduced-rubredoxin:oxygen oxidoreductase (1,2-lactonizing). Other names in common use include 2,5-diketocamphane lactonizing enzyme, camphor ketolactonase I, oxygenase, camphor 1,2-mono, and ketolactonase I. It employs one cofactor, iron.
