= Oktawia Kawęcka =

Oktawia Kawęcka (Octavia, Octavia Kay, born 1991 in Radom, Poland) is a Polish born singer, songwriter, flautist and actress. She lives and works in London. With a range of more than 4 octaves she performs both her own compositions as well as standards and cover versions. Her repertoire includes songs in Polish, English, French, Spanish, Greek, Portuguese and Italian.

== Education and career ==
Oktawia Kawęcka graduated from Fryderyk Chopin University of Music, and received scholarships from The A. Casella Conservatory in L'Aquila, Italy, and The Santa Cecilia Conservatory in Rome (C flute and opera vocals). She won many acclaimed awards at Polish and international music festivals, including, for example, Polish TV channel 1 award at the International Music and Dance Festival in Konin. Since her early years, she has also performed in numerous theatre plays. She has recorded for radio and TV- Polish National Radio, Jazzradio, Radio Kraków, Polish TVP1, TVP2, TVP3 and Polsat TV stations.

Oktawia's debut album will be released in mid September 2008. Her modern arrangements put significant emotional emphasis on the Polish composers and their works. Apart from her own songs, the album includes a jazz waltz inspired by an Etude of Frédéric Chopin, works by Stanislaw Moniuszko, worldwide renowned jazz musician Michal Urbaniak, Jerzy Wasowski, Jeremi Przybora. Oktawia was one of the first musicians in Poland to record two songs composed by an Oscar-winning composer Bronislaw Kaper.

On March 21, 2017 she released her song "Plus Minus Infinity". The track was recorded and mixed by Cosmo Entertainment Label. The track is a preview of her new album which shall premiere this year. Octavia is working on her record with musicians, that are known for their musical cooperation with Amy Winehouse i.e. Troy Miller.
