= Octavia Hall Smillie =

American dietitian

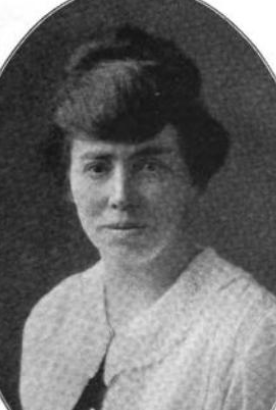
- Octavia Hall Smillie, from a 1923 publication
- Born: Octavia Irene Hall; August 30, 1889; Santa Fe, New Mexico, U.S.
- Died: December 2, 1970; Townshend, Vermont, U.S.
- Occupation: Dietitian
- Known for: President, American Dietetic Association (1922–1924)

Octavia Irene Hall Smillie (August 30, 1889 – December 2, 1970) was an American dietitian. She was chief dietitian at Peter Bent Brigham Hospital in Boston, and president of the American Dietetic Association from 1922 to 1924.

== Early life and education ==
Smillie was born in Santa Fe, New Mexico, the daughter of Edward L. Hall and Addie (or Ada) Loomis Hall. She graduated from Colorado College in 1913.

== Career ==
Smillie taught music in Colorado as a young woman. She was head dietitian at Boston's Peter Bent Brigham Hospital when she started the hospital's nutrition clinic in 1921. She was elected to a two-year term as president of the American Dietetic Association in 1922, succeeding Mary deGarmo Bryan. She presided over the association's 1923 annual meeting in Indianapolis and the 1924 annual meeting in Boston. Under her leadership, the association established a permanent central office.

In her later years, Smillie was active in the Massachusetts Dietetic Association, trained Red Cross dietitian aides during World War II, and traveled with her husband, an epidemiologist who established a school of public health in Brazil.

== Personal life ==
In 1919, Octavia Hall became the second wife of widowed physician and Harvard Medical School professor Wilson George Smillie. They raised four children together, including two children from his first marriage. The Smillies retired to Newfane, Vermont in 1958, and ran a sheep farm. She died in 1970, at the age of 81, in Vermont.
