= Camps, Fonollosa =

Camps
- Singular population entity
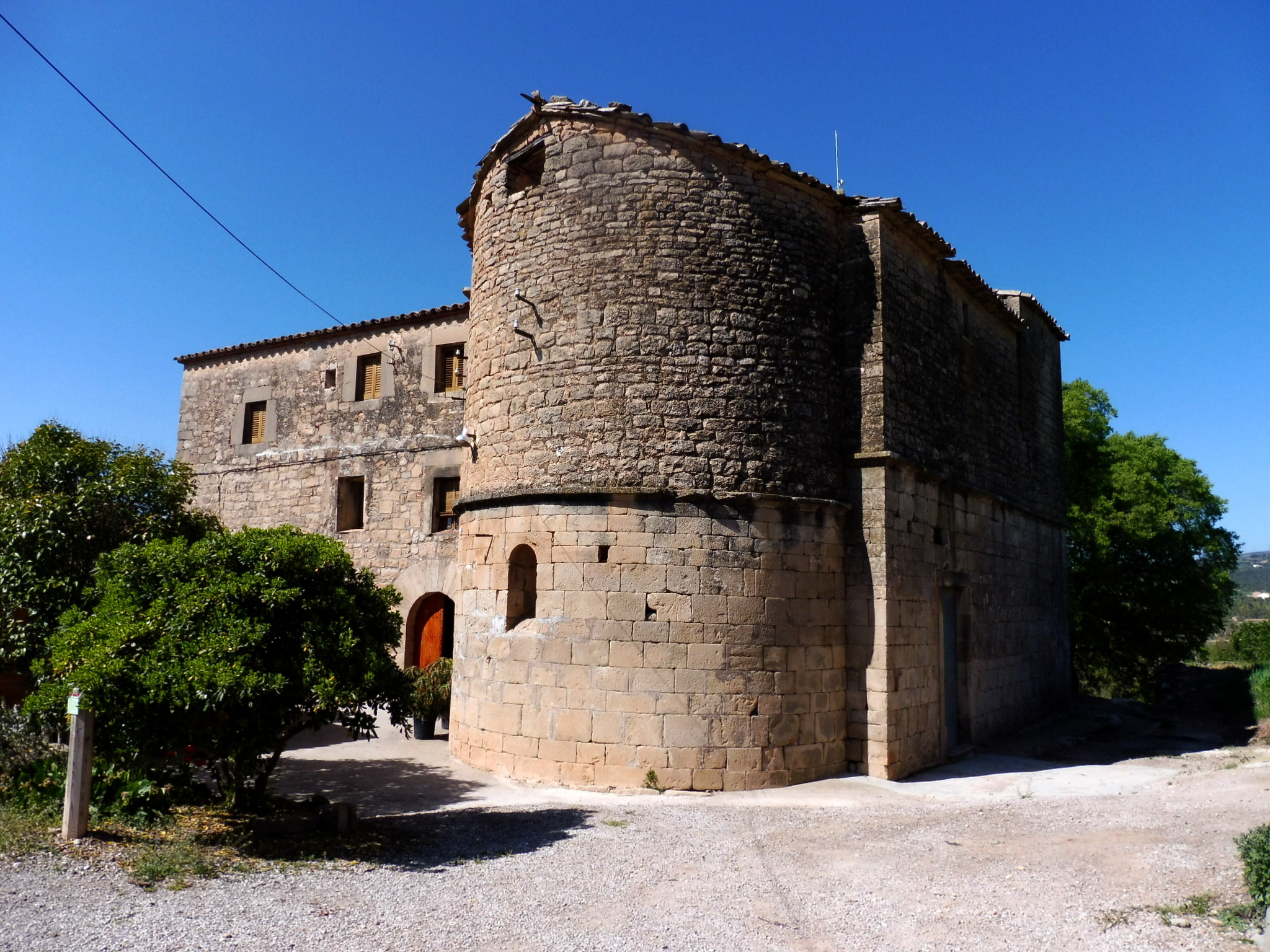
- La Pabordia de Caselles

- Location within Spain Location within Catalonia Location within Province of Barcelona
- Coordinates: 41°46′39.0″N 1°41′01.7″E
- Country: Spain
- A. community: Catalunya
- Province: Barcelona
- Municipality: Fonollosa

Population (January 1, 2024)
  - Total: 87
- Time zone: UTC+01:00
- Postal code: 08259
- MCN: 08084000100

Camps is a singular population entity in the municipality of Fonollosa, in Catalonia, Spain.

As of 2024 it has a population of 87 people.
