= Estación Camps =

Coordinates: 32°06′43″S 60°13′47″W

- Municipality and village
- Interactive map of Estación Camps
- Country: Argentina
- Province: Entre Ríos Province
- Time zone: UTC−3 (ART)

Estación Camps is a village and municipality in Entre Ríos Province in north-eastern Argentina.
