= Prague Institute of Planning and Development =

- Institut plánování a rozvoje hl. m. Prahy

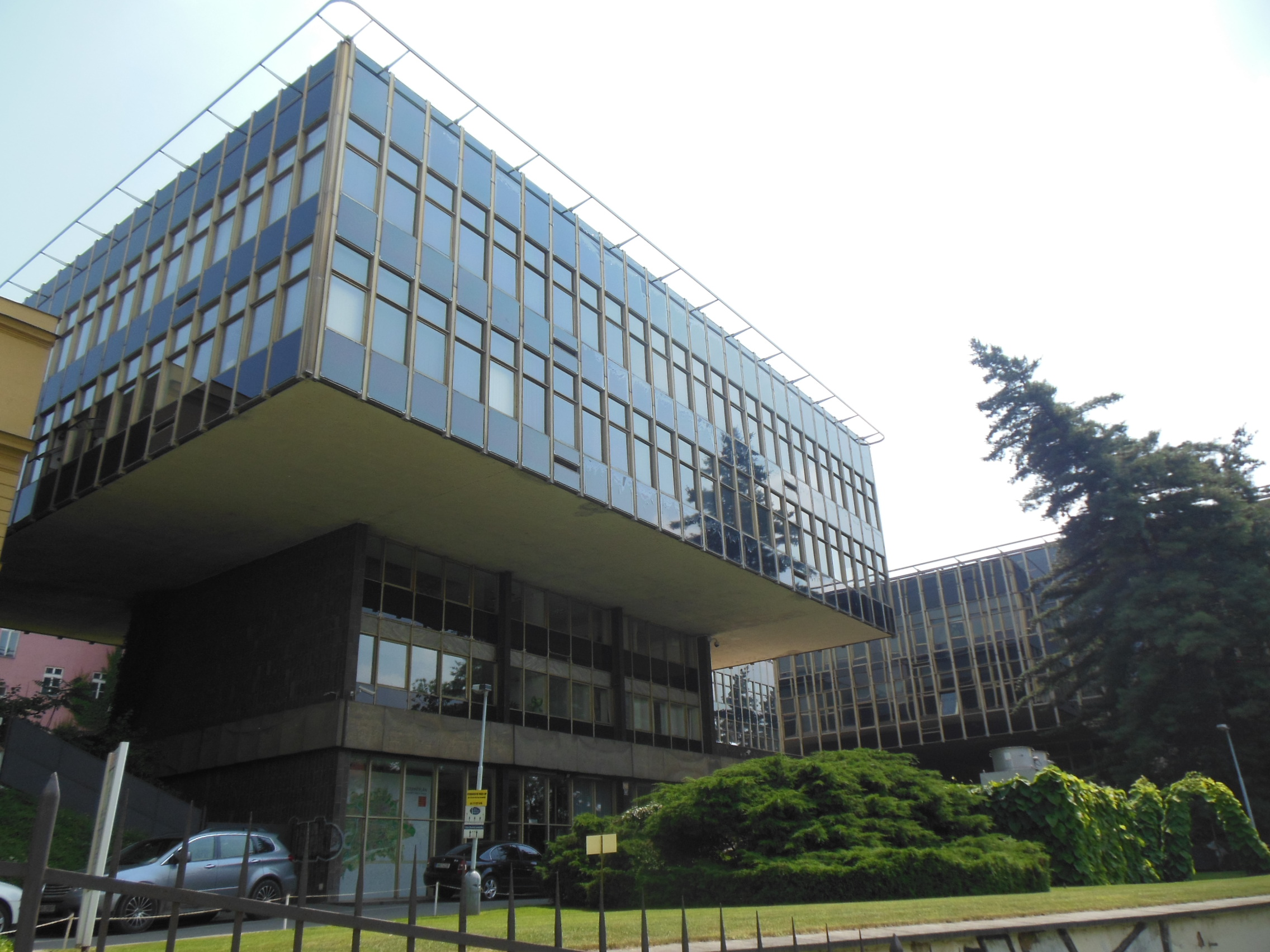
- Headquarters of IPR, 2013
- Abbreviation: IPR
- Formation: 2013; 13 years ago
- Type: City hall organization
- Location: Prague, Czech Republic
- Coordinates: 50°4′23.98″N 14°25′3.37″E
- Website: iprpraha.cz/en

Prague Institute of Planning and Development (Czech: Institut plánování a rozvoje hl. m. Prahy, abbreviation IPR) is a public-benefit corporation in charge of developing the concept behind the city's architecture, urbanism, development and formation managed by City Hall of Prague, Czechia. It represents spatial planning matters of Czech capital city, the coordination includes some documents as Prague Building Regulations, the Prague Waterfront Concept and the Prague Public Space Design Manual. It deals with the administration and propagation of main architectural competitions in the city. Institution Center for Architecture and Metropolitan Planning (CAMP) which is familiarizing public with the architectonic and urbanist plans of Prague is also managed by IPR.

It was established in 2013, and has headquarters in Prague 2, in Buildings of Association of project studios.
