= Linda Shapiro =

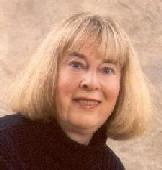

Linda G. Shapiro is a professor in the Department of Computer Science and Engineering, a professor of electrical engineering, and adjunct professor of Biomedical Informatics and Medical Education at the University of Washington.

== Education and experience ==
Shapiro graduated with a B.S. with highest distinction in mathematics and computer science from the University of Illinois in 1970. She completed her M.S. in computer science from University of Iowa in 1972 and her Ph.D. in computer science from University of Iowa in 1974. She was a faculty member in computer science at Kansas State University from 1974 to 1978 and at Virginia Polytechnic Institute and State University from 1979 to 1984. She then spent two years as director of intelligent systems at Machine Vision International in Ann Arbor, Michigan. She has been an IEEE Fellow since 1995, an IAPR fellow since 2000, and has been editor-in-chief of CVGIP: Image Understanding. Shapiro received the Pattern Recognition Society Best Paper Awards in 1989 and 1995.

== Research interests ==
Shapiro's research interests include computer vision, medical image analysis, artificial intelligence, biomedical informatics, pattern recognition, and content-based image retrieval. According to her research laboratory website, her recent research projects include Efficient Convolutional Neural Networks for Mobile Devices, Expression Recognition using Deep Neural Nets, and Digital Pathology: Accuracy, Viewing Behavior and Image Characterization.

== Publications ==
1. Haralock, Robert M. and L. Shapiro. “Computer and Robot Vision.” (1991).
2. Robert M. Haralick, Linda G. Shapiro. "Image segmentation techniques." Computer Vision, Graphics, and Image Processing, Volume 29, Issue 1, 1985, Pages 100–132, ISSN 0734-189X, https://doi.org/10.1016/S0734-189X(85)90153-7.
3. L. G. Shapiro and R. M. Haralick, "Structural Descriptions and Inexact Matching," in IEEE Transactions on Pattern Analysis and Machine Intelligence, vol. PAMI-3, no. 5, pp. 504–519, September 1981, doi:10.1109/TPAMI.1981.4767144
