= Inga Kamp =

Astronomer

Inga E. E. Kamp (born 1970, née Rentzsch-Holm) is an astronomer. Educated in Germany, she works in the Netherlands, where she directs the Kapteyn Astronomical Institute of the University of Groningen. Her research concerns star formation, planet formation, and the astrochemistry of protoplanetary disks.

== Education and career ==
After secondary school at the Gymnasium Schloß Neuhaus in Paderborn, Germany, Kamp became a physics student at Kiel University, where she received a diploma (the German equivalent of a master's degree) in 1993, and continued for a 1998 Ph.D. Her dissertation concerned carbon monoxide in protoplanetary disks around A-type stars, and was supervised by Hartmut Holweger.

Next, she became a postdoctoral researcher, working at Kiel University from 1998 to 1999, as a Marie-Curie Fellow at the Leiden Observatory from 2000 to 2002, continuing at the Leiden Observatory until 2004, and as a European Space Agency assistant astronomer at the Space Telescope Science Institute in the United States from 2004 to 2007.

She joined the Kapteyn Institute as an assistant professor in 2008. She was promoted to associate professor in 2012, and was adjunct director from 2013 until 2016. She has been a full professor since 2017, and was appointed as director of the Kapteyn Institute in 2025.

== Recognition ==
Kamp was named as a member of the Koninklijke Hollandsche Maatschappij der Wetenschappen in 2026.

Minor planet 12938 Ingakamp is named for her.
