= Camp =

Camp may refer to:

== Areas of confinement, imprisonment, or for execution ==
- Concentration camp, an internment camp for political prisoners or politically targeted demographics, such as members of national or minority ethnic groups
- Extermination camp, any of six Nazi death camps established for the systematic murder of over 2.7 million people
- Federal prison camp, one of seven minimum-security United States federal prison facilities
- Internment camp, also called a detention camp, for imprisonment (of citizens or perceived terrorists) without conviction of any crime
- Labor camp, usually associated with forced or penal labor as a form of punishment
- Nazi concentration camp run by the SS in Nazi Germany and German-occupied Europe.
- Prisoner-of-war camp
  - Parole camp, during the U.S. Civil war, where both sides guarded their own soldiers as prisoners of war
- Subcamp, one or more outlying smaller concentration camps that came under the command of a main Nazi concentration camp.

== Arts, entertainment, and media ==
=== Aesthetics ===
- Camp (style)

=== Fashion ===
- Camp: Notes on Fashion, a 2019 exhibition at the Metropolitan Museum of Art

=== Films ===
- Camp (1965 film), a 1965 underground film directed by Andy Warhol
- Camp (2003 film), a 2003 independent film written and directed by Todd Graff about an upstate New York performing arts summer camp

=== Literature ===
- Camp (novel), a 2020 young adult novel by L.C. Rosen

=== Music ===
- Camp (album), a 2011 album from rapper Childish Gambino
- Camp Records, a 1960s record label that specialized in producing gay-themed novelty records and singles
- "Camp", a song by Tired Lion from the 2017 album Dumb Days

=== Television ===
- Camp (TV series), a 2013 American television series
- "Camp", a season 3 episode of Servant (TV series)

=== Web series ===
- Camp Camp, a 2016 American adult animated web series

== Gatherings of people ==
- Camp, a mining community
- Camp, a term commonly used in the titles of technology-related unconferences
- Camp meeting, a Christian gathering which originated in 19th-century America
- Protest camp a base for protest or obstruction by physically blocking a site
- Refugee camp or displaced persons camp, a temporary encampment of people who have had to leave their country due to war or other disasters

== Military and athletics ==
- Boot camp (disambiguation)
- Cantonment
- Military camp
- Training camp

== Outdoor accommodation and recreation ==
- Campsite or campground, a recreational outdoor sleeping and eating site
- Camp, a temporary settlement for nomads
- Camp, a term used in New England, Northern Ontario and New Brunswick to describe a cottage
- Military camp
- Summer camp, typically organized for groups of children or youth
- Tent city, a housing facility often occupied by homeless people or protesters

== People ==
- Camp (surname)

== Places and areas ==
- Câmp (disambiguation), two villages in Romania
- Camp (Falkland Islands), a term used in the Falkland Islands to refer to any part of the islands outside of the islands' only significant town, Stanley
  - Camp (constituency), electoral constituency in the Legislative Assembly of the Falkland Islands
- Camp, County Kerry, a village on the Dingle Peninsula, in the Republic of Ireland
- Camp, Ohio, a community in the United States
- Pune Camp
- Camp County, Texas, a county in the United States
- Camp Nou, home stadium of FC Barcelona
- Central Atlantic magmatic province, or CAMP, a large geological formation in northwestern Africa, southwestern Europe, northeastern South America and southeastern North America

== Other uses ==
- Camp (style), an ironic appreciation of that which might otherwise be considered outlandish or corny; also a description of effeminate male homosexual mannerisms and speech in British English
- Camp Coffee, a concentrated coffee-flavoured syrup
- T.H. Camp (shipwreck), a Lake Superior shipwreck off the coast of Wisconsin
- Campism, geopolitical belief that divides the world into competing political "camps"

== See also ==
- Boot camp (disambiguation)
- Caamp, American folk band
- The Camp (disambiguation)
- CAMP (disambiguation), including cAMP and camP
- Câmp (disambiguation), two villages in Romania
- Camper (disambiguation)
- Camping (disambiguation)
- Camps (disambiguation)
- Campus
- Campy (disambiguation)
- CHAMPUS, acronym for U.S. Dept. of Defense program to provide civilian health benefits for U.S. Armed Forces military personnel, retirees, and their dependents.
- Kemp (disambiguation)
