= Kempes =

Kempes is a surname. Notable people with the surname include:

- Mario Kempes (born 1954), Argentine footballer
  - Estadio Mario Alberto Kempes, stadium named after him
- Edwin Kempes (born 1976), Dutch tennis player
- Kempes (Brazilian footballer) (1982–2016), born Everton Kempes dos Santos Gonçalves, Brazilian footballer
