= Câmp =

Câmp may refer to several places in Romania:

- Câmp, a village in the town of Vașcău, Bihor County
- Câmp, a village in Urmeniș Commune, Bistrița-Năsăud County
- Câmp (river), a tributary of the Uz in Bacău County

== See also ==
- Camp (disambiguation)
