= Beatriz =

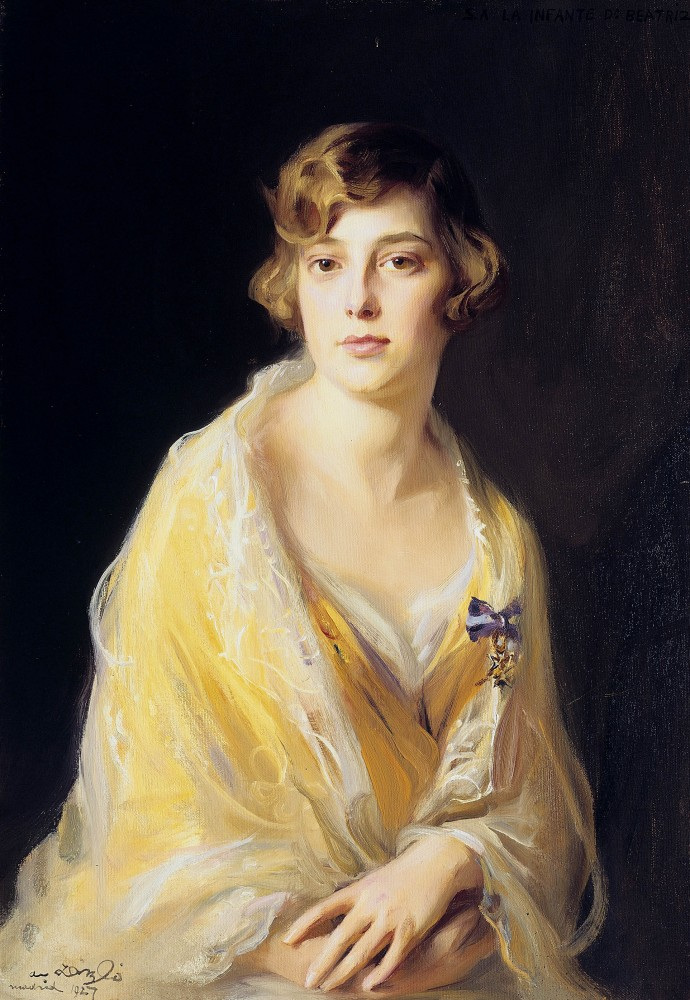
- Infanta Beatriz of Spain
- Pronunciation: Beh-ah-trees
- Gender: Female
- Name day: August 17th (Spain); July 29th (rest of the world)

Origin
- Language: Latin
- Meaning: brings joy, brings happiness to others

Other names
- Short forms: Bea, Bee, Bia
- Nicknames: Trizie, Bebe
- Anglicisation: Beatrice
- Derivative: From Latin "beatus"
- Usage: Spain, Latin America, Portugal
- Related names: Beatrix, Beatrice, Beata, Béatrice, Beate, Bea, Bee, Beatorisu

Beatriz (Spanish: [be.aˈtɾiθ], Portuguese: [bi.ɐˈtɾiʃ]) is a Spanish, Galician and Portuguese female first name. It corresponds to the Latin name Beatrix and the English and Italian name Beatrice. The name in Latin means 'brings joy' and in other languages also means 'she who brings others happiness'. It became relatively popular in Japan as Beatorisu ( ベアトリス) with the Japanese-Brazilian immigration to Japan in recent years.

== Given name ==
=== Royalty / Nobility ===
- Infanta Beatriz of Spain (1909-2002), Infanta of Spain, daughter of King Alfonso XIII and Victoria Eugenie of Battenburg
- Beatriz of Portugal (1373-1420), Queen of Castile and León
- Beatriz of Portugal, Duchess of Viseu (1430-1506), Duchess of Viseu
- Beatriz of Portugal, Duchess of Savoy (1504-1538), Duchess Consort of Savoy, Infanta of Portugal
- Beatriz, Countess of Arundel (1380-1439), Portuguese Noblewoman
- Beatriz de Suabia (1203-1235), Queen of Castile and León
- Beatriz de Bobadilla (1440-1511), 15th Century Spanish Noblewoman and Courtier
- Beatriz de Bobadilla y Ossorio (1462-1504), 16th Century Spanish Mistress of the Canary Islands
- Beatriz de Castro Osorio, 3rd Countess of Lemos, wife of Dinis of Braganza, Count of Lemos
- Beatriz Clara Coya (1556–1600) Princess of the Inca Empire
- Beatriz Pereira de Alvim (1380-1414), Portuguese noblewoman
- Beatriz de la Cueva (1498-1541), Spanish colonial governor
- Beatriz of Swabia (1198-1212), Holy Roman Empress

=== Athletes ===
- Beatriz Araujo (born 1955), Argentine former professional tennis player
- Bea Beltrán (born 1997), Spanish footballer
- Beatriz Bezerra (born 2006), Brazilian competitive swimmer
- Beatriz Camuñas, Mexican swimmer
- Beatriz Capotosto (1962-2018), Argentine athlete who specialised in the sprint hurdles
- Beatriz Carneiro (born 1998), Brazilian Paralympic swimmer
- Beatriz Gomes (born 1979), Portuguese sprint canoer
- Beatriz Gómez Cortés (born 1994), Spanish swimmer
- Beatriz Cruz (born 1980), retired track and field athlete
- Beatriz Zaneratto João, known as Bia Zaneratto (born 1993), Brazilian professional footballer
- Ana Beatriz (born 1985), Brazilian racing driver
- Beatriz Briones (born 1999), Mexican sprint kayaker
- Beatriz Manchón (born 1976), Spanish sprint canoer
- Beatriz Escribano (born 1990), Spanish handball player
- Gigi Fernández (born 1964), former tennis player
- Beatriz Martins (born 1994), Portuguese trampoline gymnast
- Beatriz Martín (born 1974), Spanish judoka
- Beatriz Recari (born 1987), Spanish professional golfer
- Beatriz Souza (born 1998), Brazilian judoka
- Beatriz Vaz e Silva, commonly known as Bia Vaz (born 1985), Brazilian soccer coach and former player
- Beatríz Vílchez (born 1995), Cuban female volleyball player
- Beatriz Pérez (born 1991), Spanish field hockey midfielder
- Beatriz Lucero Lhuillier, Philippine athlete who won Olympic medals in gymnastics and taekwondo
- Beatriz Sánchez (born 1989), Spanish basketball player
- Beatriz Mesquita, Brazilian Jiu Jitsu competitor
- Beatriz Corrales (born 1992), Spanish badminton player
- Beatriz Neila (born 2002), Spanish motorcycle racer
- Beatriz Pellón (born 1960), Spanish professional tennis and field hockey player
- Beatriz Mendoza, Paralympic athlete from Spain competing mainly in category T12 sprint events
- Beatriz Flamenco (born 1995), hurdler from El Salvador
- Beatriz Flamini, Spanish extreme athlete and mountaineer
- Beatriz Parra Salas, known as Bea Parra (born 1987), Spanish footballer
- Beatriz Ferrer-Salat (born 1966), Spanish equestrian
- Beatriz Haddad Maia (born 1996), Brazilian professional tennis player
- Beatriz Hatz (born 2000), American Paralympic athlete who competes in long jump and sprinting events
- Beatriz Prades Insa, known as Bea Prades (born 1999), Spanish footballer
- Beatriz Travalon (born 1993), breaststroke swimmer from Brazil
- Beatriz Monteiro (born 2005), Portuguese Para-badminton player
- Beatriz Padrón (born 2003), Costa Rican swimmer
- Beatriz Ortiz (born 1995), Spanish female water polo player
- Beatriz Santiago (born 1968), Spanish long-distance runner
- Beatriz Ros (born 1974), Spanish long-distance runner
- Beatriz Dávila (born 1956), Argentine wheelchair basketball player
- Beatriz Dizotti (born 2000), Brazilian swimmer
- Beatriz Castillo (born 1954), Cuban sprinter
- Beatriz Francisco (born 1996), Brazilian group rhythmic gymnast
- Beatriz Ferreira (born 1992), Brazilian professional boxer
- Beatriz Feres (born 1988), Brazilian synchronized swimmer, model and actress
- Beatriz Linhares (born 2003), Brazilian rhythmic gymnast
- Beatriz Futuro (born 1986), Brazilian rugby sevens player
- Beatriz Pascual (born 1982), Spanish race walker
- Beatriz Pirón (born 1995), Dominican weightlifter
- Bea de Leon (born 1996), Filipino basketball player
- Beatriz Fernández (born 1985), Spanish handball player
- Beatriz Martínez (born 1986), Spanish sport shooter
- Beatriz García (born 1970), Spanish international football midfielder
- Beatriz Vieira (born 2011), Brazilian rhythmic gymnast

==== Ballet Dancers ====
- Beatriz Consuelo (born 1932-2013), Brazilian-Swiss ballerina and dance instructor
- Beatriz Stix-Brunell (born 1993), American ballet dancer

==== Chess Players ====
- Beatriz Marinello (born 1964), Chilean-born American chess player
- Beatriz Alfonso Nogue (1968-2019), Spanish chess player

=== Academics ===
- Beatriz Amendola, Uruguayan-American radiation oncologist
- Beatriz Amélia Alves de Sousa Oliveira Basto da Silva (born 1944), Portuguese Academic
- Beatriz Barbuy, Brazilian astrophysicist
- Beatriz Barba (1928–2021), Mexican academic, anthropologist, and archaeologist
- Beatriz Susana Cougnet de Roederer (1930-2022), pioneer of Argentine physics, specializing in the field of cosmic radiation and high-speed physics
- Beatriz Galindo (c. 1465–1534), Spanish physician and educator
- Beatriz Jaguaribe, Brazilian communications professor and editor
- María Beatriz Nofal, Argentine economist
- Beatriz García Vasallo, Spanish Academic
- Beatriz Nascimento (1942-1995), Afro-Brazilian academic and activist
- Beatriz Luna, developmental neuroscientist
- Paul B. Preciado (born 1970, born as Beatriz Preciado), Spanish Philosopher
- Beatriz Cortez, Los Angeles–based artist and scholar from El Salvador
- Beatriz Noheda, professor at the University of Groningen and the director of the Groningen Cognitive Systems and Materials Center (CogniGron)
- Beatriz Santos Arrascaeta (born 1947), Uruguayan writer, educator, singer and activist of African descent
- Beatriz Rico, professor of developmental neurobiology at King's College London
- Beatriz Roldán Cuenya (born 1976), Spanish physicist working in surface science and catalysis
- Beatriz Ghirelli (1915-1992) Argentinian engineer, pioneer of standardisation practices
- Beatriz Francisca de Assis Brandão (1779-1868), Neoclassical or Arcadian Brazilian poet, translator, musician, educator and early feminist
- Beatriz Maggi (1924-2017), Cuban essayist, professor, and literary critic
- Beatriz Miranda Galarza (born 1971), Ecuadorian researcher
- Beatriz Colomina (born 1952), Historian

=== Religious Figures ===
- Beatriz of Silva (1424-1492), Christian saint
- Dona Beatriz (1684–1706), Congolese prophet known as Kimpa Vita
- Beatriz Ferrari, Uruguayan church official

=== Activists ===
- Beatriz Ramírez Abella (born 1956), Uruguayan activist
- Carolina Beatriz Ângelo (born 1878), Portuguese feminist and suffragist
- Beatriz Pinheiro (1872-1922), Portuguese writer concerned with improving the rights of women
- Beatriz Peniche Barrera (1893-1976), writer, teacher and Mexican feminist
- Paula Beatriz (born 1971), Brazilian activist and educator

=== Artists ===
- Dulce Beatriz (1931-2021), Cuban-born artist
- Beatriz Milhazes (born 1960), Brazilian artist
- Beatriz Pacheco Pereira (born 1951), Portuguese writer, teacher, sculptor, columnist, critic and specialist in Portuguese cinema
- Beatriz Mejia-Krumbein (born 1945), Colombian artist
- Beatriz Santiago Muñoz (born 1972), artist based in San Juan, Puerto Rico
- Beatriz Zamora (born 1935), Mexican artist
- Beatriz Helena Ramos, artist, entrepreneur, film director, producer and illustrator
- Beatriz Caso (1929-2006), Mexican sculptor
- Beatriz de la Fuente (1929-2005), Mexican Art Historian
- Beatriz González (1932–2026), Colombian painter, sculptor, critic, curator and art historian

=== Authors / Poets / Journalists ===
- Beatriz Bracher (born 1961), Brazilian author
- Beatriz Doumerc (1929-2014), Argentine author of children's literature
- Beatriz Williams, American author
- Beatriz Hernanz, Spanish poet and critic
- Beatriz Bernal, Spanish author
- Beatriz Cienfuegos (1701-1786), Spanish editor and journalist
- Beatriz Copello, Australian writer, poet, playwright and psychologist
- Beatriz Sarlo (1942-2024), Argentine literary and cultural critic
- Beatriz Guido (1924–1988), Argentine novelist and screenwriter
- Beatriz Villacañas (born 1964), poet, essayist and literary critic

=== Musicians ===
- Beatriz Parra Durango (born 1940), Ecuadorian classical soprano
- Beatriz de Dia (born c. 1140), the most famous of the trobairitz
- Beatritz de Romans (also spelt Beatriz or Bieiris), a Trobairitz
- Beatriz Balzi (1936–2001), Argentinean pianist, professor and musicologist
- Beatriz Bilbao (born 1951), Venezuelan composer
- Beatriz Pichi Malen (born 1953), stage name of Norma Beatriz Berretta, Argentine singer of Mapuche origin
- Beatriz Renta (born 1942), Argentine composer, musicologist, and pedagogue
- Beatriz Luengo (born 1982), Spanish musician
- Beatriz Adriana (born 1958), Mexican singer of ranchera
- Beatriz da Conceição (1939–2015), Portuguese fado singer
- Beatriz Lockhart (1944-2015), Uruguayan pianist, music educator and composer
- Beatriz Ferreyra (born 1937), Argentine composer

=== Politicians and Public Servants ===
- Beatriz Rojkés de Alperovich (born 1956), Argentine politician
- Beatriz Argimón (born 1961), Uruguayan politician
- Beatriz Artolazabal (born 1970), Spanish politician
- Beatriz Allende (1943–1977), Chilean Socialist politician and revolutionary
- Beatriz Corredor (born 1968), Spanish lawyer and politician
- Beatriz Merino (born 1947), the only female prime minister of Peru
- Beatriz Hevia (born 1992), Chilean politician
- Beatriz Carrillo (born 1975), Spanish politician and lawyer
- Beatriz Gutiérrez Müller (born 1969), Former First lady of Mexico
- Beatriz Valle (born 1966), Honduran politician
- Beatriz Porée (born 1966/67), Jersey politician
- Beatriz Cervantes Mandujano (born 1976), Mexican politician
- Beatriz Paredes Rangel (born 1953), Mexican politician
- Beatriz Pastor, American politician
- Beatriz Rosselló (born 1985), Former First Lady of Puerto Rico and Puerto Rican politician
- Beatriz Sánchez (born 1970), Chilean journalist and politician
- Beatriz Ofelia de León (born 1964), First female President of the Supreme Court of Guatemala
- Beatriz Jiménez Linuesa (born 1985), Spanish politician
- Beatriz Buchili, Mozambican lawyer
- Beatriz Zavala (born 1957), Mexican politician
- Beatriz Magaloni (born 1968), Mexican political scientist
- Beatriz Fanjul (born 1991), Spanish politician

=== Models ===
- Ana Beatriz Barros, (born 1982), Brazilian model

=== Architects ===
- Beatriz del Cueto (born 1952), Cuban-Born Puerto Rican Architect
- Beatriz Ramo (born 1979), Spanish Architect and Urbanist
- Beatriz Peschard, Mexican architect

=== Entrepreneurs ===
- Beatriz Acevedo, American entrepreneur

=== Actresses ===
- Beatriz Aguirre (1926-2019), Mexican film and television actress
- Beatriz Batarda (born 1974), British-Portuguese actress
- Beatriz Bonnet (1930-2020), Argentine film and television actress and comedian
- Beatriz Carvajal (born 1949), Spanish actress
- Beatriz Costa (1907–1996), Portuguese actress
- Beatriz Escalona (1903-1979), American comic actress
- Beatriz Segall (1926–2018), Brazilian actress
- Beatriz Segura (born 1975), Spanish actress
- Beatriz Rente (1858-1907), Portuguese theatre actor
- Beatriz Rico (born 1970), Spanish actress
- Bia Nunnes (born 1958), Brazilian actress
- Beatriz Saavedra, Mexican actress
- Beatriz Shantal, Mexican actress, singer, and model
- Beatriz Sheridan (1934–2006), Mexican actress and director
- Ana Martín (born 1947), Mexican actress (born Beatriz Solorzano)
- Ana Beatriz Nogueira (born 1967), Brazilian actress
- Beatriz Michelena (1890–1942), American silent film actress
- Beatriz Montañez (born 1977), Spanish TV presenter and actress
- Beatriz Monteiro (actress) (born 1999), Portuguese actress
- Beatriz Spelzini, Argentinian actress
- Beatriz Taibo (1932-2019), Argentine film and TV actor
- Beatriz Thibaudin (1927-2007), Argentine film, stage, and television actress
- Stephanie Beatriz (born 1981), American actress
- Beatriz Salomón (1953-2019), Argentine actress
- Beatriz Valdés (born 1963), Cuban-Venezuelan actress

=== Screenwriters / Directors ===
- Beatriz Flores Silva (born 1956) Uruguayan-Belgian film director
- Beatriz Azurduy Palacios (1952–2003), Bolivian movie director
- Beatriz Seigner, Brazilian film director and screenwriter

=== Personalities ===
- Beatriz Trapote, Spanish Media Personality
- Beatriz Saw (born 1985), Filipino TV Personality

=== Miscellaneous ===
- Beatriz Enríquez de Arana (1467–1521), the mistress of Christopher Columbus
- Beatriz Canedo Patiño, Bolivian fashion designer
- Beatriz de Palacios, African-Spanish soldier

== Fictional characters ==
- Beatriz DaCosta, a DC Comics superhero with the alternate identities Green Fury and Green Flame
- Beatriz Aurora Pinzón Solano, the title character of the Colombian telenovela Yo soy Betty, la fea
- Beatriz Garcia, aka Penny Century, a fictional character in the comic book series Love and Rockets, by Los Bros Hernandez
- Beatriz Almazán, El maleficio (2023 TV series)
- Beatriz San José (played by Cynthia Klitbo in the telenovela Amor amargo)
- Beatriz, Under Her Control (2022)
- Beatriz "Bibi" Ramirez, Primos

== Films / TV Shows ==
- Beatriz at Dinner (2017)
- Beatriz, The Wife (set to be released)
- Beatriz (1976)
- Beatriz's War (2013)

== Places ==
- Santa Beatriz, neighbourhood in Peru
- Beatriz, Cidra, Puerto Rico
- Beatriz, Caguas, Puerto Rico
- Beatriz, Cayey, Puerto Rico

== See also ==
- Beatrice (disambiguation)
- Beatrix (disambiguation)
- Beatriz (disambiguation)
- Beata
