= Los Angeles Organizing Committee for the 2028 Olympic and Paralympic Games =

Organizing committee for the 2028 Olympic and Paralympic games

The Los Angeles Organizing Committee for the 2028 Olympic and Paralympic Games (LAOCOG) (French: Comité d'Organisation des Jeux Olympiques et Paralympiques de Los Angeles 2028) is the organizing committee for the 2028 Summer Olympics and the 2028 Summer Paralympics which are scheduled to be held in Los Angeles, California in the United States. Casey Wasserman is president and as a chairperson of the committee. Reynold Hoover is CEO. The committee was established on 31 July 2017.

== Board of directors ==
The board of directors, governed by volunteers, consists of the following members:

- Casey Wasserman (Chairperson)
- Secretary Elaine Chao
- Katie Ledecky
- Alison Ressler
- Andy Campion
- Anita DeFrantz
- Ann Philbin
- Beatriz Acevedo
- Dana Shell Smith
- David Haggerty
- Gene Sykes
- Jaime Lee
- Janet Evans
- Jeanie Buss
- Jeffrey Katzenberg
- Jessica Alba
- José E. Feliciano
- Lex Gillette
- Mark Attanasio
- Marc Stern
- Mark Tatum
- Matt Johnson
- Megan Smith
- Mellody Hobson
- Michael Johnson
- Muffy Davis
- Pete Rodriguez
- Sarah Hirshland
- Stuart Waldman
- Yvonne Wheeler

== Athletes’ Commission ==
The Athletes’ Commission is focused on the experience of the athletes competing at the 2028 Olympics and Paralympics. It consists of following 19 members:

- Janet Evans (Chair)
- Allyson Felix
- Queen Harrison
- Nastia Liukin
- Ibtihaj Muhammad
- Apolo Anton Ohno
- Adam Rippon
- Alex Shibutani
- Howard Shu
- Brenda Villa
- Scout Bassett
- Samantha Bosco
- Allison Compton
- Lex Gillette
- Alana Nichols
- Ileana Rodriguez
- Rico Roman
- Oscar Sanchez
- Ahkeel Whitehead

== Headquarters ==
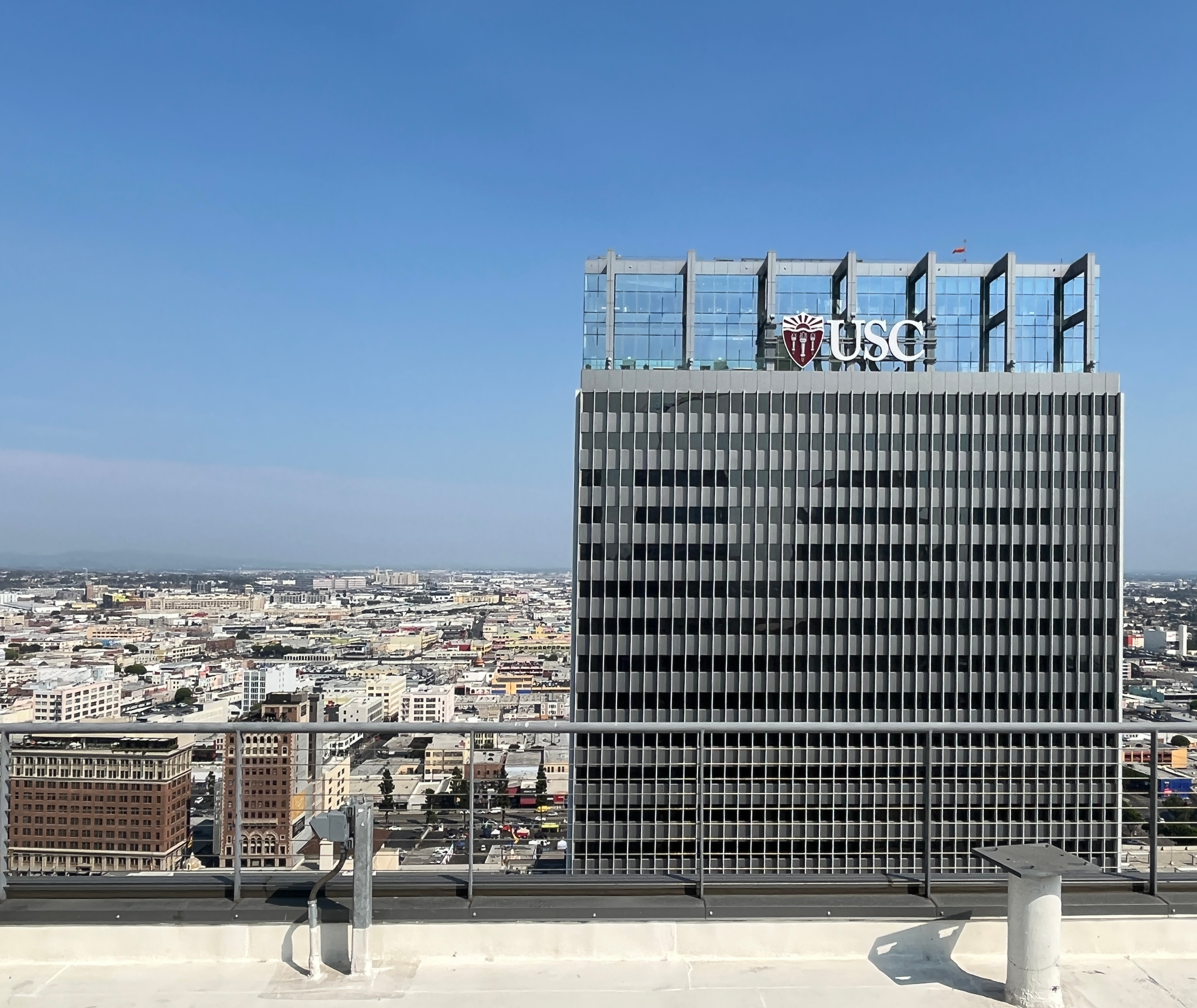
LA28 is headquartered at the USC Tower.

The Los Angeles Organizing Committee for the 2028 Olympic and Paralympic Games is headquartered at the USC Tower in Downtown Los Angeles and has had their offices there since 2025. Prior to 2025, their headquarters were in Westwood at 10900 Wilshire Boulevard.

== See also ==
- 2028 Summer Olympics
- 2028 Summer Paralympics
