= Beatriz (disambiguation) =

Beatriz is a given name. It may refer to:

== Places ==
- Beatriz, Caguas, Puerto Rico, a barrio
- Beatriz, Cayey, Puerto Rico, a barrio
- Beatriz, Cidra, Puerto Rico, a barrio

== Surname ==
- Ana Beatriz (born 1985), Brazilian racing driver known as Bia Figueiredo
- Stephanie Beatriz (born 1981), American actress
- Paola Beatriz (born 1984), Brazilian activist

== Other uses ==
- Hurricane Beatriz (disambiguation), various Pacific tropical cyclones
- Beatriz (film), a 1976 Spanish-Mexican drama film

== See also ==
- Beatrice (disambiguation)
- Beatrix (disambiguation)
