= Beatriz Monteiro =

Beatriz Monteiro may refer to:

- Beatriz Monteiro (actress)
- Beatriz Monteiro (badminton)
