= Malen =

Malen may refer to:

== People ==
- Beatriz Pichi Malen (born 1953), Argentine singer
- Donyell Malen (born 1999), Dutch professional footballer
- Jetske Reinou van der Malen (1681–1752), Dutch poet
- Jonathan Malen (born 1987), Canadian actor
- Lenore Malen, American artist

== Places ==
- Malen Chiefdom, a chiefdom in Pujehun District, Sierra Leone
