= Renta (disambiguation) =

Renta may refer to

- Renta, Greater Poland Voivodeship, village in Poland
- Renta 4 Banco, a bank in Spain
- Renta Nishioka, Japanese kickboxer
- Renta (surname)
- Renta!, a Japanese digital manga distributor owned by Papyless

== See also ==
- Renta congelada, Mexican sitcom
