= Lew Wasserman =

American studio executive and talent agent (1913–2002)

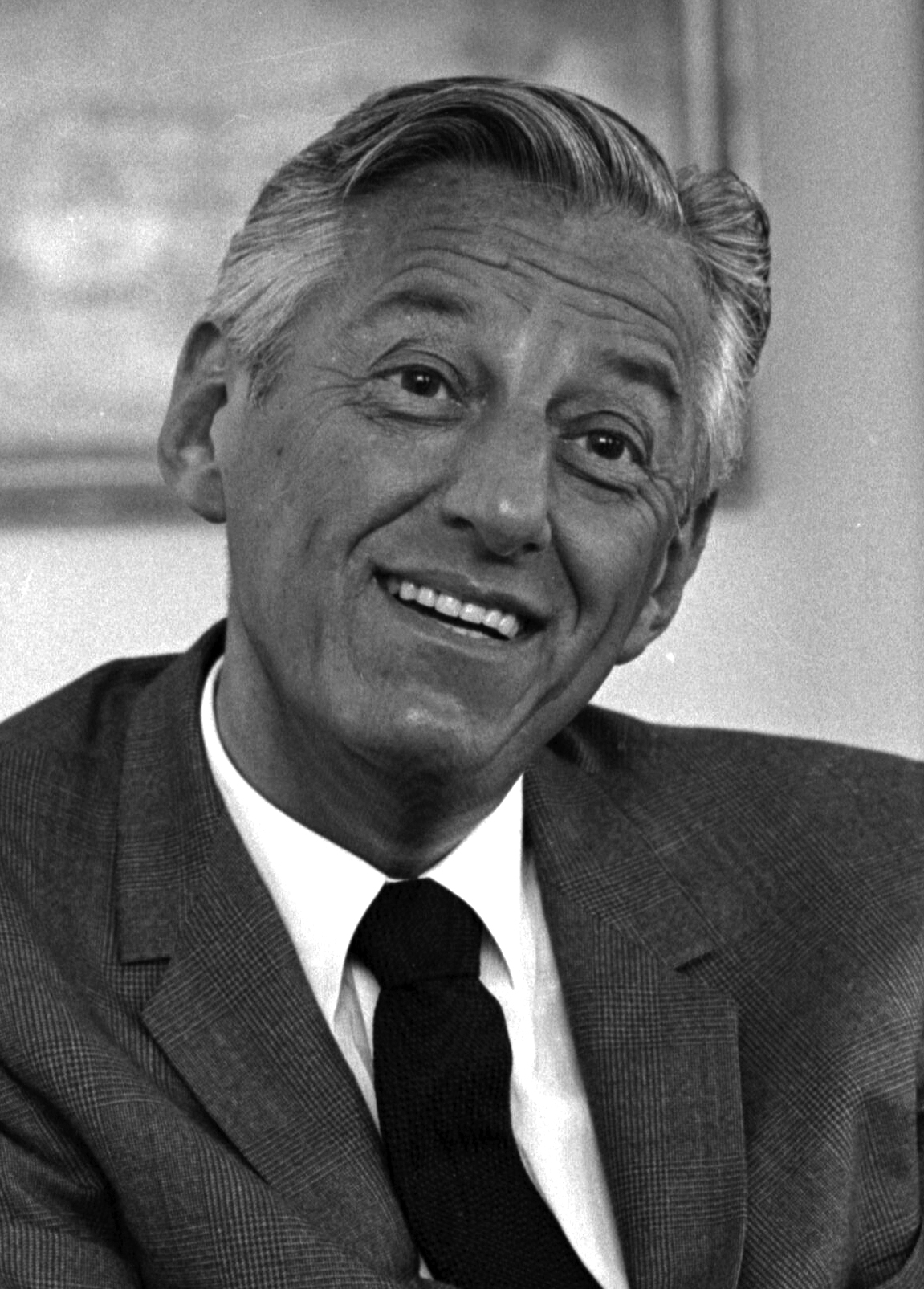
- Wasserman in 1969
- Born: Lewis Robert Wasserman; March 22, 1913; Cleveland, Ohio, U.S.
- Died: June 3, 2002 (aged 89); Beverly Hills, California, U.S.
- Resting place: Hillside Memorial Park, Culver City, California
- Occupations: Hollywood studio head; talent agent
- Spouse: Edith Beckerman (m. 1936)
- Children: 1
- Relatives: Casey Wasserman (grandson)

Lewis Robert Wasserman (March 22, 1913 – June 3, 2002) was an American businessman and talent agent, described as "the last of the legendary movie moguls" and "arguably the most powerful and influential Hollywood titan in the four decades after World War II". His career spanned nearly eight decades from the 1920s to the 2000s; he started working as a cinema usher before dropping out of high school, rose to become the president of MCA Inc. and led its takeover of Universal Pictures, during which time Wasserman "brought about changes in virtually every aspect of show business". In 1995, he was awarded the Presidential Medal of Freedom by President Bill Clinton. Several years later, he spoke of his ongoing work at Universal to Variety, saying, "I am under contract here for the rest of my life, and I don't think they would throw me out of my office—my name is on the building."

== Career ==
=== Early life ===
Wasserman was born to a Jewish family in Cleveland, Ohio, the son of Isaac Wasserman and Minnie Chernick, both emigrants from Russia. He began his show business career as an usher in a Cleveland theater in 1933. He later became a booking agent for the Music Corporation of America (MCA), founded by Jules Stein.

=== Hollywood career ===
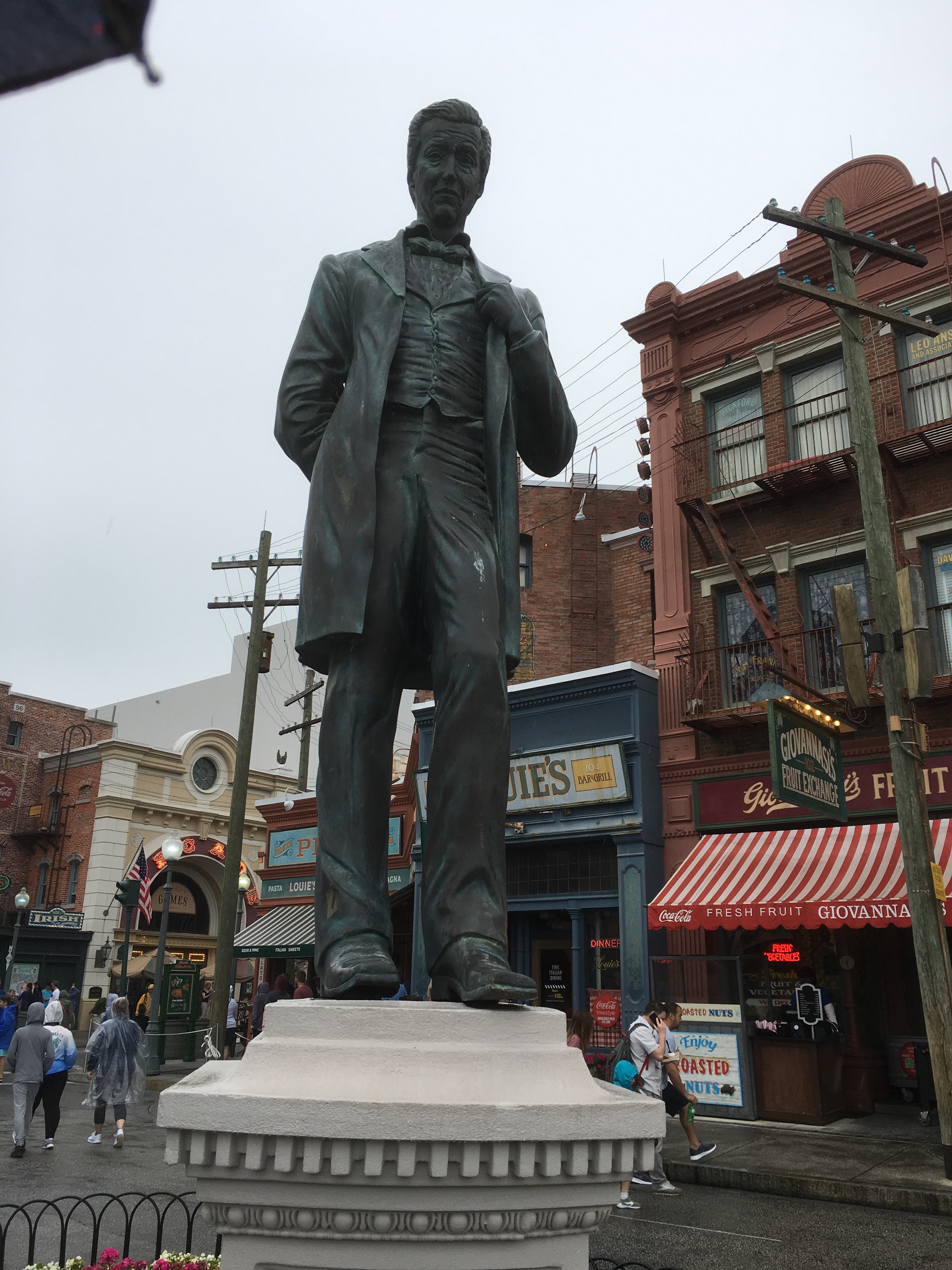
Statue of Wasserman at Universal Studios Florida. An identical statue exists in Universal Studios Japan.

Under Wasserman, MCA branched out into representing actors and actresses in addition to musicians and in the process created the star system, which drove up prices for studios. MCA struggled to gain ground in Hollywood since major agencies like those belonging to Charles Feldman, Myron Selznick, and Leland Hayward had already grabbed up most of the major talent. However, in the mid-1940s, when it purchased Hayward's agency, MCA finally gained bargaining leverage with the studios. As an agency, Wasserman's MCA came to dominate Hollywood, representing such stars as Bette Davis and Ronald Reagan.

Wasserman was an influential player and fundraiser in the Democratic Party, but was also a lifelong and instrumental advocate, mentor, and close friend of Reagan's. The Newsmeat Power Rankings identify Wasserman and his close friend Jack Valenti as two of the top five "most famous and powerful Americans whose campaign contributions result most often in victory."

At MCA, Wasserman expanded upon a business practice known as film packaging, a process established by earlier agents like Feldman and Selznick. Since studios reduced output after World War II, they let more actors out of long-term contracts, and big agencies like MCA could then negotiate stronger terms for their clients. Agents like Wasserman would pitch packages, for example a writer client, director client, and actor or actress, to the studios who then needed only to finance it. Therefore, in some respects, agencies began to do the job previously done by the studios – namely, assembling films.

Wasserman expanded on practices established by earlier agents. For example, Feldman and Selznick realized in the late 1930s that an actor could pay much less tax by turning himself into a corporation. The corporation, which would employ the actor, would own part of a motion picture in which the actor appeared, and all monies would accrue to the corporation, which was taxed at a much lower rate than was personal income.

Wasserman used this tax avoidance scheme with actor James Stewart, beginning with the Anthony Mann western Winchester '73 (1950). This marked the first time an onscreen talent ever received "points in the film" – a business tactic that skyrocketed after Wasserman's negotiation and Stewart's ensuing success.

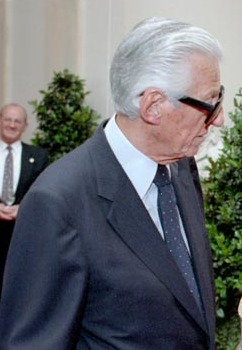
Wasserman in 1988

Following the rising postwar popularity of television and the resulting near bankruptcy of many studios, Wasserman purchased Universal Studios and Decca Records in 1962 and merged them with MCA. In 1966, he singlehandedly installed Jack Valenti as head of the Motion Picture Association of America (MPAA). Together they orchestrated and controlled much of how Hollywood operated, and was allowed to do business, for the next several decades. Wasserman ran the combined company for nearly 30 years before selling it to Japanese consumer electronics conglomerate Matsushita Electric in 1990.

According to the 2003 book When Hollywood Had a King: The Reign of Lew Wasserman, Who Leveraged Talent into Power and Influence, Wasserman was interested in acquiring The Walt Disney Company in 1984, and this deal came within inches of actually happening:

In 1984, MCA held talks about acquiring Walt Disney Studios when that company was trying to repel the advances of investor Saul Steinberg. "All the terms were done," said Barry Diller, who had learned what happened from one of the principals. "But the Disney family said that Ron Miller [a Disney executive] had to be [MCA] president. [MCA president and COO] Sid [Sheinberg] said to Lew, "It's fine." Felix [Rohatyn, the investment banker advising MCA] said to Lew, "Do it – a year from now, you'll get rid of Miller, and make Sid President." But Lew said "No. Sidney is president." "It was Lew's inflexibility that caused him to blow deals he should not have blown," Diller added. "He and Jules had built the best company – they should have owned the world. And had they made this deal with Disney, everything would have been different."

As a tribute to the man who essentially built the park, the New York section of Universal Studios Florida possesses a statue of Wasserman with an accompanying plaque. It is routinely decorated for various events, such as Halloween Horror Nights.

== Last years ==
In 1993, Wasserman created Universal CityWalk and made numerous, substantial changes to the Universal City area. Wasserman pocketed an estimated $350 million from the sale of MCA and remained as manager, but with vastly diminished power and influence, until Seagram bought controlling interest in 1995, which then resulted in his role becoming even more marginalized. Wasserman served on the board of directors until 1998. On September 29, 1995, Wasserman was presented with the Presidential Medal of Freedom by President Bill Clinton. In 1996, he was inducted into the Television Hall of Fame.

Wasserman died of complications from a stroke in Beverly Hills in 2002 and was interred in Hillside Memorial Park in Culver City. He was honored posthumously with the 2,349th star on the Hollywood Walk of Fame on October 5, 2007.

== Personal life ==
Wasserman was married to Edith "Edie" (née Beckerman), who was also Jewish.

They had one child, a daughter, Lynne Kay Wasserman. Lynne married MCA agent Ron Leif with whom she had a daughter, Carol Ann Leif; they later divorced. In 1970, Lynne married stockbroker Jack Meyerowitz. They changed their name to Myers and had a son, Casey Wasserman. This marriage also ended in divorce. Casey carries on the family name in the agency business, the Wasserman Media Group (WMG), which he started in 1998. He also acted as president and chief executive officer of the Wasserman Foundation, a charitable organization founded by the Wassermans in 1952 in Beverly Hills.

Actress Jamie Lee Curtis was Wasserman's goddaughter.

Wasserman's granddaughter, Carol Ann Leif, is a stand-up comedian.

Wasserman's widow, Edie, died on August 18, 2011, at the age of 95.

== In popular culture ==
Wasserman was portrayed by David Eisner in the CBS film Martin and Lewis (2002), Stewart Bick in the TV film The Reagans (2003), and Michael Stuhlbarg in Hitchcock (2012). Wasserman was also the subject of the documentary film The Last Mogul (2005) directed by Barry Avrich and the podcast series Glitter and Might (2023), hosted by Shawn Levy.
