= Beatriz Helena Ramos =

Venezuelan-American artist and entrepreneur

- Born: August 24, 1971 (age 54); Caracas, Venezuela
- Education: Instituto de Diseño de Caracas
- Known for: Animation
- Patrons: MTV, Disney

Beatriz Helena Ramos is an artist, entrepreneur, film director, producer, and illustrator. She is the founder of Dancing Diablo Studio in New York and the inventor of Dada.nyc, a visual conversation platform where people speak to each other through drawings.

== Early career ==
Ramos studied illustration at the Instituto de Diseño de Caracas and moved to New York in 1996 where she started working as a digital artist coloring comics. In 1997, Ramos began publishing editorial illustrations for The New York Times commissioned by legendary art director Steven Heller. That same year she was qhired at MTV Animation and it was the beginning of a prolific career in animation. Later on, she went to work on TV animated series for Disney, MTV and Cartoon Network. In 2002 she founded Dancing Diablo Studio.

=== Selected animated TV shows ===
- 1998 to 1999 Downtown MTV. Nominated for an Emmy.
- 2000 Pollo Frito - Pilot Nickelodeon
- 2000 Sheep in the Big City - TV Series Cartoon Network
- 2000 Spy Groove MTV
- 2001 Stanley Disney Channel
- 2001 JoJo's Circus - Pilot - Disney Channel
- 2001 Private Eye Princess - TV Special Cartoon Network
- 2001 The Mousochist, a short film by John R. Dilworth
- 2002 to 2005 Teenage Mutant Ninja Turtles Fox Kids.

=== Selected illustrated children books ===
- Spooky Stories. Publications International 2002.
- Amelia Makes a Deal. Rigby, 2003.
- African American Writers. Ballard & Tighe, 2004.
- Icky, Sticky, Gross Stuff Series. The Child's World, 2007.
- Don Quixote, 2008.
- Tricia's Talents. Picture Window Books, 2007.

== Dancing Diablo Studio ==
Ramos decided to open the studio in January 2002, a few months after 9/11, in the midst of a recession in New York. By April she had a six figure contract with 4Kids TV. "Brooklyn, New York is the home of a newly formed animation studio called Dancing Diablo. The studio set up shop in January 2002, and has already taken on some high profile projects, including work on Fox Kids' upcoming series Teenage Mutant Ninja Turtles."

Ramos and her business partner Diego Sanchez decided to open a sister office in Caracas, Venezuela in 2005.

As creative director of the studio, she is responsible for the fresh and original style that characterizes Dancing Diablo. Ramos has directed more than a hundred commercials and short films for TV and the web. Her work has been recognized at prestigious festivals around the world, including Ottawa International Animation Film Festival, Anima mundi Animation Festival in Brazil, ASIFA-East Animation Festival in New York, and Pictoplasma Character Festival in Berlin, among others. "Cheesy Breadville", a short film Ramos directed for PBS was recognized as one of the best short films of all time at the New York International Children's Film Festival. In 2009 Dancing Diablo got an Emmy recognition for its contribution to the Emmy Award winning program Between the Lions, a children's literacy TV series broadcast by PBS Kids.

Ramos' work as a color and animation expert has been mentioned in several books including "Color: Messages and Meanings" by Leatrice Eiseman, "Becoming a Digital Designer: A Guide to Careers in Web, Video, Broadcast" By Steven Heller & David Womack.“Total Animation” by Judith Salavetz and Spencer Drate and "Your Career in Animation" By David B. Levy. It has also been feature in industry publications such as Creativity Magazine, Advertising Age, How Magazine, Animation Magazine, among others.

== Entrepreneurship ==
Ramos is currently a mentor at the Founder Institute and a frequent speaker at business conferences. She occasionally writes articles about entrepreneurship. Most recently she published "Why Entrepreneurs Shouldn't Waste Time On Personal Branding" Fast Company.

=== Programs and awards ===
- 2004 Social entrepreneur Nell Merlino nominated Ramos for the "Rising Star Award" at the Business Women's Network. Ramos was honored with the award at a ceremony in Washington, D.C.
- 2005 Count Me In launched "Make Mine a Million $ Business Competition" Nell Merlino chose Beatriz as one of three women business owners for the pilot program. Ramos kicked off the national program along with then Senator Hillary Clinton at a press conference in Washington. “Beatriz Ramos, founder and president of Dancing Diablo, a creative advertising company located in Brooklyn and Caracas, went from seeing herself as an artist/animator making $200K in annual business revenue to being the CEO of a million-dollar plus company creating jobs. She was the inspiration for our Make Mine a Million $ Business program.” ~Nell Marino. The program helped hundreds of women owned business maximize their potential.
- 2009 Ramos was invited to the White House to be part of a one-year program for business women from the Americas organized by the US State Department.
- 2012 Ramos was accepted at The Founder Institute, an early stage incubator for tech startups. By the end of the program Beatriz founded DADA.nyc which is one of the Founder Institute top graduate companies today.

== Dada.art ==
"I created Dada because I felt there wasn't any space in the internet that was made in the artists' terms. "I've always communicated visually so I asked myself how Facebook would have looked like if it was created by artists, how would a status update be like, how would you respond to someone 's post creatively".

"“DADA is the place where visual people draw together”—or so says the site's Twitter account. But it's more than that. Here, you can share visual conversations with other artists and creative. Make a drawing, and anyone in the world can reply with another drawing. It's a spectacular way to connect, inspire creativity, and explore the way minds work together." How Design Magazine.

"DADA is strongly building on equally strong foundations from creator Beatriz Helena Ramos -who is a prolific illustrator for the likes of the New York Times, Disney and MTV" Digital Arts.

== Art ==
=== Selected art shows ===
- 2017 Trumpomania. Salomon Arts Gallery, New York, US.
- 2014 DADA Multimedia Experience. DUMBO Arts Festival, New York, US.
- 2013 Common Grounds. The Grady Alexis Gallery. New York, US.
- 2013 Black Beans Liquid Gold. Galerie R31 Berlin, Germany.
- 2013 DADA Playground Public Installation. DUMBO Arts Festival, New York, US.
- 2009 Nude. Solo show at NYU Gallatin Gallery, New York, US.
- 2008 Art Installation. Museo de Bellas Artes, Caracas, Venezuela.
- 2003 Design made by Venezuelans Consulate of Venezuela, New York, US.
- 2001 Paintings. Consulate of Venezuela, New York, US.
- 1999 Spring Studio, New York, US.
- 1994 Comics. Feria del Libro Bogotá, Colombia.
- 1994 Caracas Comics. Alianza Francesa, Caracas Venezuela.
