= Dancing Diablo =

American animation, advertising and media company

- Industry: Animation, advertising, media
- Founded: January 24, 2002; 24 years ago in Brooklyn, New York, U.S
- Headquarters: New York City, U.S.
- Key people: Beatriz Helena Ramos

Dancing Diablo is an animation, advertising, and media company based in New York.

== History ==
Dancing Diablo was founded in January 2002 in DUMBO, Brooklyn by artist Beatriz Helena Ramos as a collaborative group of artists creating design and animation for the advertising and TV industries. Early partners included illustrator and photographer Miguel Villalobos, visual effects artist David Lobser and stop-motion animator Peter Sluszka.

=== Teenage Mutant Ninja Turtles ===
Soon after Dancing Diablo opened its doors, JoEllyn Marlow, a veteran animation producer who had recently worked with Ramos on a pilot for Disney, hired the new studio to handle the color department for the Teenage Mutant Ninja Turtles (2003 TV series) . "Brooklyn, New York is the home of a newly formed animation studio called Dancing Diablo. The studio set up shop in January 2002, and has already taken on some high profile projects, including work on Fox Kids' upcoming series Teenage Mutant Ninja Turtles."AWN Animation World Network.

Dancing Diablo handled the entire color department for the 2003 TV series for seven seasons.

=== Spots for TV and Advertising ===
In January, 2004, Diego Sanchez, the studio's CFO, officially becomes Dancing Diablo's business partner and executive producer.

The same year, the studio started producing short form films for TV starting with several shorts for Sesame Workshop International. "Lisa Annunziata, Sesame Workshop’s Assistant VP of International Production, comments, "Dancing Diablo got us. They were sensitive to our needs and the needs of our audience. They have a strong background in the Latin community and it brings an added dimension to this international work."".

Dancing Diablo also began producing spots for advertising. One of its first projects was Monsters of the Deep for The Franklin Institute. "Red Tettemer producer Laura Pappanicholas explained, "although the characters were already developed, as we had designed them for the print campaign, Dancing Diablo brought them to life and took them to places we never could. Their genuine excitement about what they do is evident in every frame and the sets they created are smashing. We looked at a lot of reels and Dancing Diablo was our first choice creatively. They, in turn, loved the spots, had a great deal of enthusiasm, and were a delight to work with. It proved to be a wonderful collaboration" Animation World Network

=== Second office in Caracas, Venezuela ===
By 2005, Dancing Diablo was turning away low budget projects and Ramos and Sanchez saw an opportunity to open a second office in their native Venezuela.

Dancing Diablo Caracas was founded in June 2005 and appointed artist and professor Adriana Genel as its creative director. The studio quickly became one of the top studios in the country working for major advertising agencies. One of their first projects was a spot for Construrama commissioned by Leo Burnett Venezuela which won a prestigious ANDA GOLD for Best Animation award, by the National Association of Advertisers (Asociación Nacional de Anunciantes).

After a great 10-year run, Dancing Diablo Caracas closed its doors in 2015, amid acute political and economic turmoil in Venezuela.

=== Live Action Division ===
In 2007, Diablo produced their first live action spots shot on 35mm for Coca-Cola Latin America.

In 2009 Expands "Dancing Diablo has doubled its DUMBO studio space and signed with Zinndependent For East coast and Midwest representation." Stash Media.

Diablo launched a live action division. "Dancing Diablo, the animation, production, and visual FX boutique, marked its eighth anniversary with the launch of a full-service live-action production division - and the expansion of its infrastructure, to create a seamless environment that guides each project from conceptual development through production, animation, and postproduction."Animation World Network, .

=== Digital Content Agency ===
Dancing Diablo New York continues its operations and has turned into a digital content agency working directly with brands like Macy's.

== Notable work ==
- 2005 Franklin Institute, "Monsters of the Deep". Red Tettemer. Featured in AWN.
- 2005 Oxygen, "Design". Selected at the Ottawa International Film Festival. Winner of Excellence in Design at ASIFA-East Animated Film Festival.
- 2006 'Siniestro' short film by Dancing Diablo. Featured in Stash DVD Magazine, Winner of Excellence in Design at ASIFA-East Festival.
- 2006 Jet Blue, "Ann Wachtel". JWT NY. Featured in Creativity The New York Times,
- 2007 Bronx Zoo, "Go Wild". Deutsch NY. Featured in Creativity, The New York Times,
- 2009 Sesame Workshop, "Spike and Bubble". Winner of Excellence in Design at ASIFA-East Animated Film Festival.
- 2009 PBS, "The Emperor’s New Clothes ". Winner of Excellence in Design at ASIFA-East Animated Film Festival.
- 2016 Vroom, "Superheroes". Johannes Leonardo. Featured in Creativity
