= Methodist Church in Uruguay =

The Methodist Church in Uruguay (Spanish: Iglesia Metodista en el Uruguay) is a Methodist Christian denomination in Uruguay. It is a member of the World Methodist Council and an autonomous affiliate of the United Methodist Church.

== History ==
The church was founded by British missionaries in the mid-1800s. In 1893 it became a district, when the Latin America Conference was formed. In 1952 the Uruguay provisional Conference was formed; in 1968 it became autonomous. It has 1,000 members and 12 congregations.

== Beliefs ==
Women can be ordained in the denomination, and from 1994 to 2000 the president of the church was a lay woman, Beatriz Ferrari.

The Church has also resolved that pastors that wish to minister to LGBTQ could do it.

=== Marriage ===
Some congregations support blessings of same-sex marriage.
