= Casey Wasserman =

American businessman (born 1974)

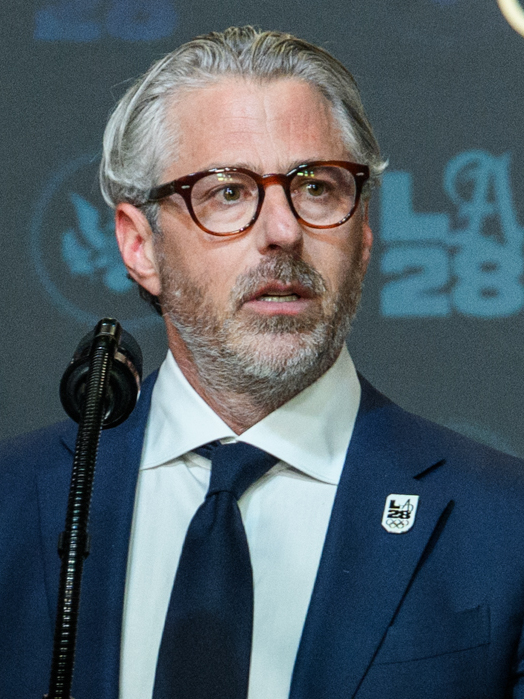
- Wasserman in 2025

President of the Los Angeles Organizing Committee for the 2028 Olympic and Paralympic Games
- Incumbent
- Assumed office August 11, 2024
- Leader: Thomas Bach; Kirsty Coventry
- Preceded by: Tony Estanguet (Paris 2024)
- Succeeded by: Andrew Liveris (Brisbane 2032)

Chair of the Los Angeles Organizing Committee for the 2028 Olympic and Paralympic Games
- Incumbent
- Assumed office July 31, 2017
- Preceded by: Position established

Personal details
- Born: Casey Myers; June 28, 1974 (age 52) Los Angeles, California, U.S.
- Party: Democratic
- Spouse: Laura Ziffren Wasserman (divorced)
- Relatives: Lew Wasserman (maternal grandfather)
- Education: University of California, Los Angeles (BA)
- Occupation: Businessman, philanthropist

Casey Wasserman (né Myers; born June 28, 1974) is an American businessman and philanthropist. He is the founder of the Los Angeles-based sports, entertainment, and talent agency Wasserman. He also serves as chairperson and president of LA28, the organizing committee for the 2028 Summer Olympics and Paralympics, and as president and chief executive of the Wasserman Foundation, a philanthropic foundation of the Wasserman family.

== Early life and education ==
Wasserman was born on June 28, 1974, in Los Angeles to Lynne Wasserman and Jack Myers. His parents divorced when he was seven, and he was raised primarily by his mother. His maternal grandfather, entertainment executive Lew Wasserman, longtime chairman of MCA, served as a mentor throughout his youth. Wasserman adopted his grandfather's surname at age 18. His family is of Ukrainian Jewish descent.

At age 10, he served as a torchbearer during the 1984 Summer Olympics in Los Angeles. He attended Brentwood School and graduated from the University of California, Los Angeles (UCLA) in 1996 with a BA in political science.

== Career ==
=== Los Angeles Avengers ===
In 1998, Wasserman purchased the Los Angeles Avengers, an expansion franchise of the Arena Football League (AFL) for about $5 million. He remained the team's owner throughout its existence and was elected chairman of the league. During his tenure, he negotiated a national television partnership between the league and NBC television, as well as the collective bargaining agreement with its players. The Avengers ceased operations in April 2009 as the Arena Football League folded. In 2015, Wasserman was inducted into the National Football Foundation (NFF) Hall of Fame.

=== Wasserman Media Group ===
In 2002, Wasserman founded Wasserman Media Group, a Los Angeles-based sports marketing and talent representation firm. The company grew through a series of acquisitions, including sports marketing firm Envision, action sports agency The Familie, and production company 411 Productions, later relaunched as Studio 411.

In 2016, Wasserman Media Group rebranded as Wasserman and was frequently referred to as "Team Wass".

In 2019, Wasserman earned over $200 million in commissions, making it the second most profitable sports agency that year. That same year, Wasserman became the first agency to have a client selected in the first round of all six of North America’s major team sports drafts. In 2020, Wasserman was again the second most valuable sports agency, earning $331 million in commissions and signing $5.7 billion in contracts.

In January 2026, correspondence between Wasserman and Ghislaine Maxwell dating to 2003 was released as part of documents related to Jeffrey Epstein. Following the release, several artists left Wasserman's music agency. Soccer player Abby Wambach also announced she would leave the firm. Several others, including Best Coast, Beach Bunny, Hot Mulligan, Louis the Child, and John Summit, called for Wasserman to step down from the agency. Wasserman said he "deeply regrets" the correspondence, which predated the public disclosure of Maxwell's crimes.

On February 13, 2026, Wasserman announced that he had begun the process of selling the agency and would step back from his representation business interests. In March 2026, the agency rebranded as "The Team". In July 2026, The Team and Providence Equity Partners announced an agreement under which The Team would acquire Wasserman's remaining ownership interest.

=== LA28 ===
Wasserman chaired the bid committee that led Los Angeles's successful campaign to host the 2028 Summer Olympics. The International Olympic Committee (IOC) awarded the Games to Los Angeles in September 2017 under an agreement that also awarded Paris the 2024 Summer Olympics. He was appointed chairman of the LA28 organizing committee on July 31, 2017, and additionally assumed the role of president on August 11, 2024, succeeding Gene Sykes.

In 2020, amid the George Floyd Protests, Wasserman, in a letter sent on Juneteenth, urged IOC President Thomas Bach to amend Rule 50 of the Olympic Charter to allow athletes to engage in anti-racist advocacy. Rule 50 prohibits athletes from partaking in any kind of "demonstration or political, religious or racial propaganda" during the Olympics, a ban which extends to gestures like kneeling or raising a fist. Bach defended the rule in an op-ed published in The Guardian, reaffirming his stance that the Games should remain "politically neutral", writing that boycotts don't work, and that without the rule the Olympics would "descend into a marketplace of demonstrations of all kinds".

In February 2026, following the release of Wasserman's 2003 correspondence with Ghislaine Maxwell as part of documents related to Jeffrey Epstein, several Los Angeles political figures, including Los Angeles mayor Karen Bass, Los Angeles County supervisors Janice Hahn and Lindsey Horvath, Los Angeles City Controller Kenneth Mejia, and five members of the Los Angeles City Council, called for him to resign from LA28. An external legal review commissioned by the LA28 board concluded that his interactions with Epstein and Maxwell did not extend beyond what had already been publicly documented. The board's executive committee subsequently voted to retain him as chairman.

== Philanthropy and political activities ==
=== Wasserman Foundation ===
Wasserman serves as the president and CEO of the Wasserman Foundation, a private family foundation, which was founded by his grandparents, Edie and Lew Wasserman, in 1952. The foundation supports initiatives in education, the arts, health, public service, and international programs.

In education, the foundation has supported scholarships and access programs, including the Wasserman Scholars fund at UCLA. In 2024, it committed up to US$4 million to fund classroom projects in the Los Angeles Unified School District through DonorsChoose, in partnership with Creative Artists Agency.

The foundation is also a longtime donor to UCLA. In 2015, it announced a US$10 million naming gift for the university's football training facility. The 75,000-square-foot Wasserman Football Center, named in recognition of the foundation and its president, opened on the UCLA campus in August 2017.

=== Civic and cultural roles ===
Wasserman serves on the boards of the Motion Picture & Television Fund and UCLA's Jules Stein Eye Institute and is a trustee of the Los Angeles County Museum of Art. He also serves as co-chair of the UCLA Second Century Council and is a member of the university's Centennial Committee. He has also served on the boards of the LBJ Presidential Library, the video game publisher Activision, and the digital media company Vox Media. In 2025, he was named to the search committee that identified a new head football coach at UCLA.

=== Politics ===
Wasserman has also been active in political fundraising. He co-chaired a fundraiser for Hillary Clinton's presidential campaign on August 22, 2016. However, ahead of the 2026 midterm elections, he has donated to Republican candidates. In September 2025, he donated $10,000 to Republican Senator Susan Collins, and organized a fundraiser for her campaign, which he co-hosted with Sherry Lansing.

== Personal life ==
Wasserman had a close relationship with his grandfather. The two would have breakfast together every Saturday and Sunday from the time he was a child until his grandfather's death in 2002. He is divorced from music supervisor Laura Ziffren Wasserman, whose grandfather Paul Ziffren was a Democratic Party leader and chair of the Los Angeles 1984 Summer Olympics Organizing Committee. They have a son and a daughter.

Sporting positions
Preceded by (France) Tony Estanguet	President of Organizing Committee for Summer Olympic Games; 2028	Succeeded by (Australia) Andrew Liveris
