= South Park Center =

Skyscraper in Los Angeles

USC Tower
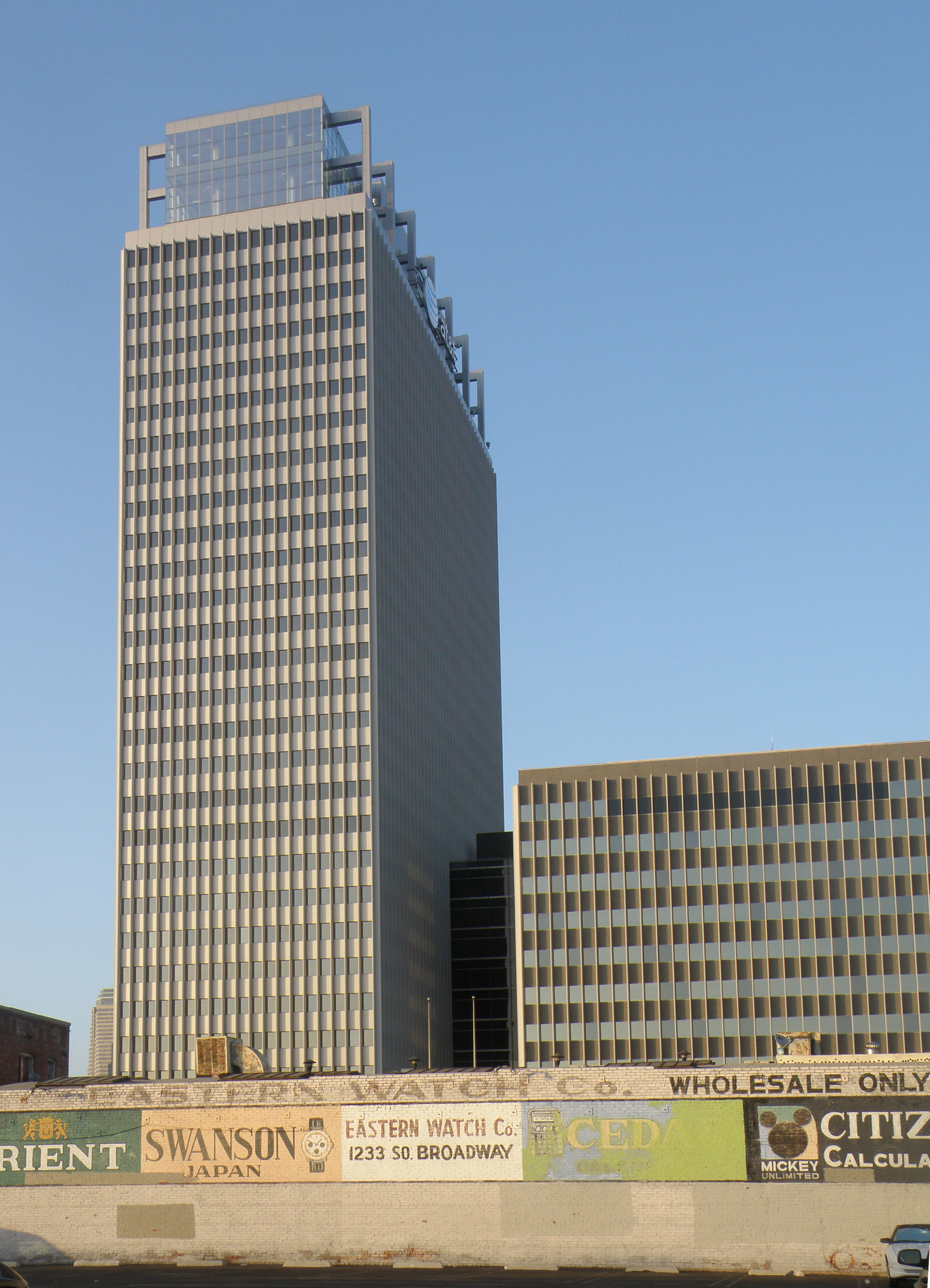
- Former names: AT&T Center; SBC Tower; Transamerica Tower; Occidental Life Building

General information
- Status: Completed
- Type: Commercial offices SBC Tower; Transamerica Tower; Occidental Life Building
- Architectural style: International style Modernism
- Location: 1150 South Olive Street; Los Angeles, California
- Coordinates: 34.0395°N 118.261853°W
- Construction started: 1962
- Completed: 1965
- Owner: Canyon-Johnson Realty Advisors

Height
- Roof: 137.77 m (452.0 ft)

Technical details
- Floor count: 32
- Floor area: 54,035 m^{2} (581,630 sq ft)

Design and construction
- Architect: William Pereira & Associates
- Structural engineer: Brandow & Johnston

USC Tower, formerly AT&T Center, SBC Tower, Transamerica Building, and Occidental Life Building, is a 32-story, 138 m (453 ft) skyscraper in the South Park neighborhood of Los Angeles, California, United States. Built to house the offices and computer center of the Occidental Life Insurance Company, it was completed in 1965. It is the 45th-tallest building in Los Angeles, and was the second-tallest (after the Los Angeles City Hall) when it was completed. The International styled building was designed by William Pereira & Associates.

== History ==
The building is part of a 12-acre (4.9 ha) complex built as Occidental Center, and now known as South Park Center. In the 1960s, 70s and 80s there was a restaurant at the top of the building—The Tower—that served award-winning French cuisine. It originally included two other large buildings - a 225,000-square-foot (20,900 m^{2}) building at 1149 Hill Street, a 300,000-square-foot (28,000 m^{2}) building at 514 W 12th Street (which was later sold to the city as the Public Works Building). It also included three parking decks with 3,500 spots, and a 6-acre (2.4 ha) plot on the corner of Eleventh and Olive Streets. The three buildings are connected by underground pedestrian tunnels.

Canyon-Johnson Realty Advisors bought the 3-building complex and various parking lots and structures in April 2003 for $88 million. After closing, one building was sold to the California State Bar Association which had occupied that building as a tenant. Another building was sold to the LAPD as a temporary HQ while the Parker Center renovation was completed. The tower was leased to SBC in 2004. Canyon-Johnson sold numerous surface parking lots to developers and the fully-leased tower to LBA Realty in 2005. In 2007 to 2008 it went under a $35 million renovation. Scaffolding was put around the building's crown, the metallic panels were replaced, and the office space was upgraded. It has since been rebranded as South Park Center along with the renaming of the 32-story tower as USC Tower in 2015.

In 1987, the exterior and rooftop of the building was used in the music video for The Alan Parsons Project's "Standing on Higher Ground".

In 2011 the exterior of the building was used in the music video for Avicii's "Levels" with the top of the building having a sign saying Levels/Le7vels.inc.

The Los Angeles Organizing Committee for the 2028 Olympic and Paralympic Games is headquartered at the USC Tower after moving into the building in 2025. They previously had their headquarters in Westwood at 10900 Wilshire Boulevard.

== See also ==
- List of tallest buildings in Los Angeles

== Sources ==
- Angelenic
- Angelenic
- Los Angeles Business Journal. Vol. 28, no. 38.
- "South Park Center – Urban complex that speaks to creative, tech, and professional firms in Downtown Los Angeles". Retrieved November 17, 2023
- "USC name to rise over downtown Los Angeles". USC Today. February 20, 2015. Retrieved November 17, 2023.
