= Mitú (entertainment) =

Latino media company

mitú
- Founded: 2012
- Headquarters: Los Angeles
- Founders: Beatriz Acevedo, Roy Burstin and Doug Greiff
- Industry: Entertainment
- Services: MultiChannel Network. Brands: We are mitú, Somos mitú, Fierce, Crema by mitú, Things That Matter.
- Parent: Latido Networks
- Website: wearemitu.com

Mitú (stylized in all lowercase) is an English/Spanish-language Latino media company, multichannel network (MCN) and digital content publisher. In 2016, the network became the largest Hispanic focused digital channel in the world with 2 billion views per month.

== Background ==
mitú was founded in 2012 by Emmy award-winning Beatriz Acevedo, Doug Greiff and Roy Burstin. The networking conglomerate achieved 40 million subscribers across 1200 partner channels by 2014. The company's YouTube channel (we are mitú) has 373,000 direct subscribers as of May 2020. mitú is headquartered in Los Angeles.

Peter Chernin put together a $3 million investment vehicle to initially fund mitú in 2012, and in 2014, Disney's Maker Studios followed with second round funding of $10 million. By 2016, the network was serving 2 billion video views per month on Facebook and YouTube. Series C fuding, which included Verizon, brought venture funding levels to $43 million. In 2018, Acevedo and several top executives were cut from mitú in a reorganization when Maker Studios was folded into Disney Digital Network. Latido Networks, a division of GoDigital Media Group, acquired mitú in early 2020, its e-commerce shop mitushop.com and, Latino TV Channel Mitu TV. Their brands include wearemitú, somos mitú, Fierce, crema and Things That Matter.

== Restructuring and acquisition ==
In July 2018, Mitú underwent a significant corporate restructuring amid financial and strategic challenges facing the digital media industry. As part of the reorganization, the company laid off approximately 30 percent of its workforce. The restructuring also coincided with major leadership changes, including the departures of co-founder and president Beatriz Acevedo and chief executive officer Herb Scannell.

Following the layoffs, Mitú shifted its strategic focus toward profitability and branded content. Co-founder Roy Burstin returned as chief executive officer, and the company raised additional funding in an effort to stabilize operations and continue as an independent media company.

Despite these efforts, Mitú was unable to achieve sustained independent growth. In February 2020, the company was acquired by Latido Networks, a subsidiary of GoDigital Media Group, for approximately $7 million, a sharp decline from its reported $85 million valuation two years earlier, as part of a broader consolidation within the Latinx digital media sector. Following the acquisition, Mitú was integrated into Latido’s media portfolio rather than operating as an independent digital publisher, reflecting ongoing challenges in monetizing multicultural digital media platforms at scale.

Following the acquisition by Latido Networks, Mitú faced allegations concerning the closure of its Colombia office. Approximately 12 employees, including members of the finance and merchandising teams, were asked to voluntarily resign and were later rehired under new contracts for a brief period before being terminated. Former employees stated that these actions were coordinated between Mitú’s former leadership and the new management team following the acquisition, resulting in the loss of severance pay and employment benefits required under Colombian labor law, and that no compensation was provided upon termination.

== Allegations of Mismanagement and Non-Payment ==
In January 2024, allegations surfaced against Mitú Inc. with accusations of financial mismanagement and non-payment made by various YouTubers. Among those speaking out was Holly, a prominent YouTuber with over 3.39 million subscribers on her channel "Superholly". In a video posted on her channel, Holly accused Mitú Inc. of withholding payments from her and numerous other content creators. According to Holly, Mitú Inc. enticed YouTubers with promises of collaborations, improved advertising, and increased channel revenue in exchange for managing their YouTube payments. However, instead of fulfilling these promises, the company allegedly delayed payments and deducted a percentage (ranging from zero to over 40%) from creators' earnings.

The situation escalated when influencers publicly denounced Mitú Inc. for non-payment and financial exploitation. Many expressed fear of speaking out due to concerns of not being paid if they did so. Despite the outcry on social media platforms, Mitú Inc. has yet to respond to the allegations, leaving several content creators unpaid and frustrated. These allegations have raised concerns within the YouTube community regarding the treatment of content creators by digital media networks and the need for greater transparency and accountability in such partnerships.
