= Ruth de Souza =

Brazilian actress (1921–2019)

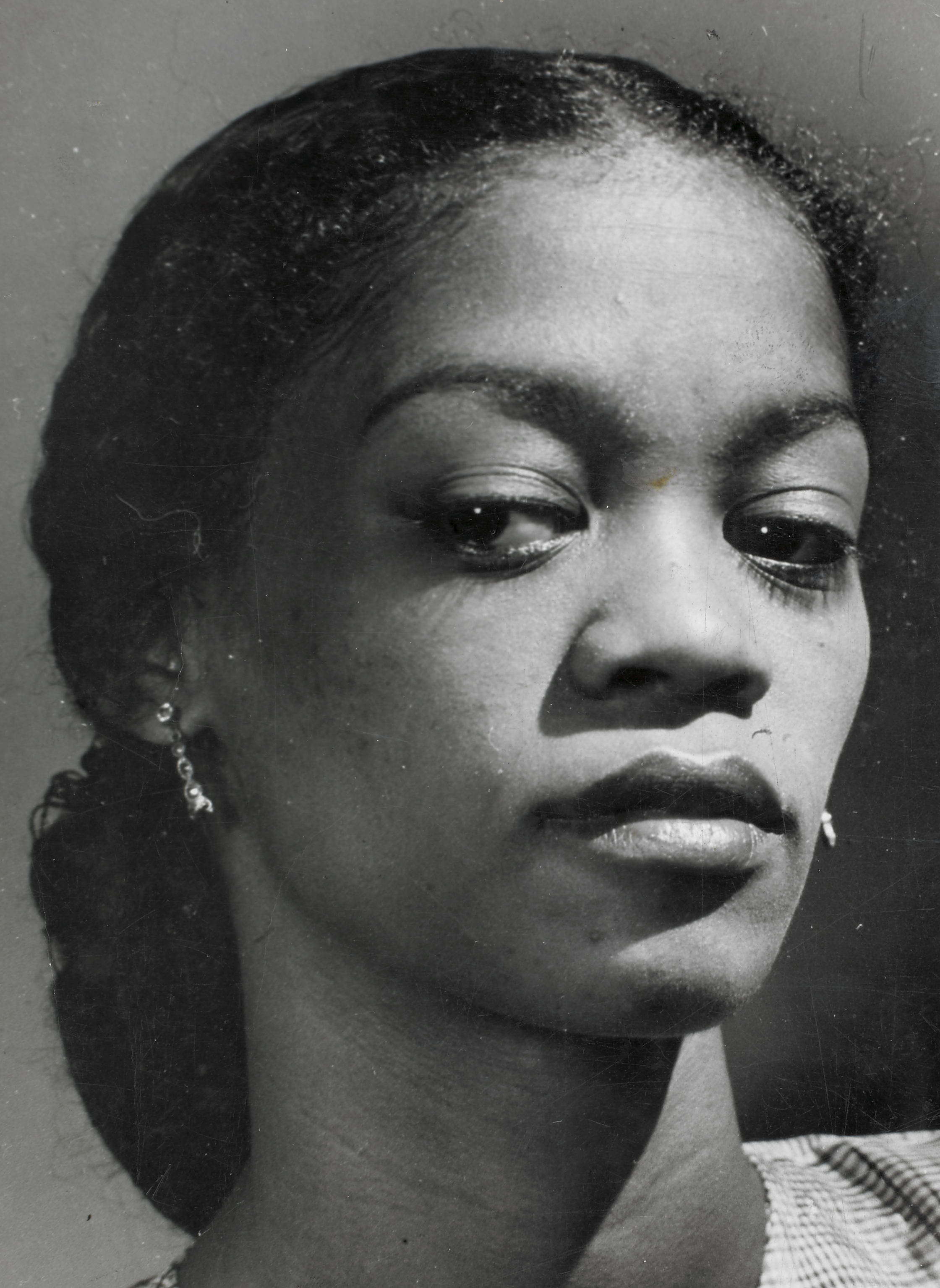
- Souza in 1968
- Born: Ruth Pinto de Souza; May 12, 1921; Rio de Janeiro, Brazil
- Died: July 28, 2019 (aged 98); Rio de Janeiro, Brazil
- Occupation: Actress
- Years active: 1945–2018

Ruth Pinto de Souza was a Brazilian actress. She was born in Rio de Janeiro on May 12th, 1921 and died in Copacabana on July 28th, 2019. In 1945, she became the first Afro-Brazilian actress to perform at the Municipal Theater of Rio de Janeiro in the play O Imperador Jones. She was also the first Afro-Brazilian actress selected for the prize of best actress at an international film festival for her performance in Sinhá Moça at the Mostra of Venice in 1954.

== Biography ==
As a member of the Black Experimental Theater (Teatro Experimental do Negro, TEN), she is one of the first Black actresses in dramatic theater in Brazil and one of the first to perform at the Teatro Municipal do Rio de Janeiro. The Black Experimental Theater was created in 1944 in Rio de Janeiro, Brazil, to combat racism and create opportunities for Black talent in theater. Along with other Afro-Brazilians women, Ruth participated in the premiere performance of TEN as a member of the chorus and later played the Native Woman, the only female character in Eugene O'Neill's play The Emperor Jones. She was awarded with Prêmio Saci.

She died in Rio de Janeiro in the neighbourhood of Copacabana in July 2019 at the age of 98.

== Tribute ==
On May 12, 2021, Google celebrated her 100th birthday with a Google Doodle.

Ruth de Souza was portrayed by Eli Ferreira in the 2024 Brazilian telenovela Garota do Momento.

== Ruth de Souza Awards ==
In 2019 the Black Community Council, managed by the government of the São Paulo state, gave awards to prominent figures of the state's black community in honor of Ruth de Souza. Paula Beatriz, the first transgender woman to direct a state school, was among the laureates.

== Selected filmography ==
- Terra Violenta (1948)
- Falta Alguém no Manicômio (1948) as Júlia
- Também Somos Irmãos (1949) as Rosália
- A Sombra da Outra (1950)
- Terra É Sempre Terra (1951) as Bastiana
- Ângela (1951)
- The Landowner's Daughter (1953) as Sabina
- Candinho (1954) as Manuela
- Who Killed Anabela? (1956)
- Osso, Amor e Papagaio (1957)
- Ravina (1958)
- Fronteiras do Inferno (1959)
- Macumba Love (1960) as Mama Rata-loi
- A Morte Comanda o Cangaço (1960) as Praying Woman
- Bruma Seca (1960)
- Favela (1961)
- O Assalto ao Trem Pagador (1962) as Judith
- Gimba, Presidente dos Valentes (1963) as Chica Maluca
- O Cabeleira (1963)
- As Cariocas (1966) (segment "Roberto Santos")
- O Homem Nu (1968)
- O Bem-Amado (1973, TV Series) as Chiquinha do Parto
- Um Homem Célebre (1974)
- Pureza Proibida (1974)
- Pontal da Solidão (1974) as Narrator
- Ana, a Libertina (1975)
- Quem Matou Pacífico? (1977)
- Ladrões de Cinema (1977)
- Fruto do Amor (1981) as Dra. Elza
- Jubiabá (1986)
- A Grande Arte (1991) as Old Woman Kissing (uncredited)
- Boca (1994) as Mrs. Esteban
- A Glass of Rage (1999)
- Aleijadinho - Paixão, Glória e Suplício (2000) as Joana Lopes
- O Clone (2001, TV Series) as Dona Mocinha da Silva
- Filhas do Vento (2004) as Maria Aparecida (Cida)
- Em Quadro (2009)
- O Vendedor de Passados (2015) as Dona Célia
- Primavera (2018) as Josephina / Matilda / Madre Amélia
- Se Eu Fechar Os Olhos Agora (2019) as Madalena dos Santos
