= Renta (surname) =

Renta or de la Renta is a surname. Notable people with the surname include:

- Luis Álvarez Renta
- Beatriz Renta
- Oscar de la Renta
- Salina de la Renta
- José Ortiz de la Renta
- Annette de la Renta
- Giraldo González de la Renta
- José Casimiro Ortíz de la Renta
- Francisco Ortíz de la Renta
