= Bea Prades =

Spanish footballer (born 1999)

Personal information
- Full name: Beatriz Prades Insa
- Date of birth: 16 November 1999 (age 26)
- Place of birth: Onda, Spain
- Position: Midfielder

Team information
- Current team: Fundación Albacete
- Number: 22

Senior career*
| Years | Team | Apps | (Gls) |
| 2013–2014 | Villarreal | | |
| 2014–2015 | Valencia B | | |
| 2015–2019 | Levante B | | |
| 2016–2019 | Levante | 1 | (0) |
| 2019–2022 | Villarreal | 55 | (2) |
| 2022–2023 | Glasgow City | 20 | (3) |
| 2023– | Fundación Albacete | | |
- * Club domestic league appearances and goals as of 01 May 2023 (UTC)

Beatriz Prades Insa (born 16 November 1999) is a Spanish footballer who plays as a midfielder for Spanish club Fundación Albacete.

== Club career ==
Prades started her career at Villarreal.
