= Terapia Ranbaxy =

Romanian pharmaceutical company

Terapia S.A.
- Type: Private
- Industry: Pharmaceutical
- Founded: 1921
- Headquarters: Cluj-Napoca, Romania
- Area served: Europe
- Products: List of Terapia S.A. products

Terapia S.A. is a Romanian pharmaceutical company founded in 1921. The company is headquartered in Cluj-Napoca, Cluj, Romania and has regional centers in Moscow City, Russian Federation and Kyiv, Ukraine. The company is part of the multinational corporation Daiichi Sankyo.

Terapia Ranbaxy produces a wide range of medicines and drugs, mostly from the field of cardiovascular, antibiotics, cholesterol-lowering, beta-blockers and pain relief medicine.

== History ==
The company was founded in 1921, under the name of Terapia medication company.

The company has expanded during the Interbellum, and the company soon became responsible for the production of certain generic medicine.

During the Second World War, the company has played an important role in delivering drugs and medical supplies to the battlefields.

Terapia S.A. became an anonymous company in November 1990.

In 1996, the company went through a privatization process. Romferchim S.A., a state-owned company, purchased 396,208 shares, which accounted for over 3/4 of the company's total assets.

In 2004, due to a rough economic downfall and poor management, the company went through a massive restructuring process. It had to sack a thousand employees, and the production of 35-40 medications has been ceased. In late 2004, Advent International has purchased over 95% of the company. This has been the greatest pharmaceutical transaction in Romania at the time.

In 2006, Advent had sold 96.7% of the company to Ranbaxy. Terapia S.A. therefore went through a brand name change, and so it became Terapia Ranbaxy. Two years later, the Japanese pharmaceutical giant Daiichi Sankyo had purchased 1/5 of the company, and so Terapia Ranbaxy became part of the giant.

== Pioneer ship ==
Terapia S.A. has been the first Romanian company to have a bioequivalence laboratory accredited by GCP.
