= Beatriz Ferrari =

Uruguayan church official

Beatriz Ferrari De Arias is a Uruguayan church official. She was president of the Evangelical Methodist Church in Uruguay from 1994 until 2000.

== Life ==
Ferrari worked for three years as a volunteer missionary, engaging with young people in Spain. For ten years she then worked as the Secretary for Women and Children Concerns of the Latin American Council of Churches. As a lay woman, she was elected president of the Methodist Church in Uruguay in 1994, and served as president until 2000.
