= Beatriz Dávila =

Argentine Paralympic athlete

Personal information
- Born: 1956 (age 69–70) Rosario, Santa Fe, Argentina
Medal record
Women's wheelchair basketball
Representing Argentina
Paralympic Games
Silver medal – second place	1972 Heidelberg	Women's basketball

Beatriz Dávila (born 1956) is an Argentine former wheelchair basketball player, noted for being one of the Paralympic medalists in her country. Dávila won the gold medal in wheelchair basketball at the 1972 Summer Paralympics.

In 2014, the City of Rosario included her name on one of the plaques placed on the Paseo de los Olímpicos. For her sporting achievements, she was recognized in Argentina as a Master of Sport.

== 1972 Summer Paralympics ==
The women's basketball team was made up of Cristina Benedetti, Liliana Chiaradía, Beatriz Dávila, Graciela Di Simone, Diana Masini, Graciela Puy, Silvia Tedesco and Noemí Tortul. Seven countries participated: Argentina, Canada, Great Britain, Israel, Jamaica, West Germany, and Yugoslavia which were divided into two groups. Argentina came out first in Group B, beating Jamaica 25-24 and Great Britain 47–8. In the semifinal they beat Germany 30–22. In the final Argentina had to face Jamaica again, which it had already beaten by just one point in the qualifying stage. Again the game was very even and the victory went to Argentina 25–22.
