= Beatriz Trapote =

Spanish media personality

- Born: 3-6-1981; Leganés, Madrid
- Occupations: Spanish media personality and reality TV contestant
- Spouse: Víctor Janeiro (2013-)

Beatriz Hernández Trapote is a Spanish media personality and reality TV contestant.

== Career ==
In 2003, she began doing small odd jobs on Channel 4. In 2006 she made frequent appearances at the program of Telecinco, TNT [add source]. Later she became a reporter for the late night program of Telecinco Vuélveme Loca and occasional collaborator of the successful program Sálvame diario.

In May 2010, she made the cover of the Interviú magazine and this year she participated in the reality show Supervivientes (España).

In 2010 summer she works as a partner at the morning program of Telecinco, El programa de Ana Rosa.

In March 2013, she participated in the program ¡Mira quién salta!.

== Private life ==
On 3 November 2013 she married Víctor Janeiro in Jerez de la Frontera (Cádiz). Three days later, the pictures of their wedding were published exclusively by the magazine ¡HOLA! (HELLO! in the Spanish edition).
