= Beatriz Lockhart =

Uruguayan pianist and music educator

Beatriz Lockhart (17 January 1944 – 23 November 2015) was an Uruguayan pianist, music educator and composer.

== Life and career ==
Beatriz Lockhart was born in Montevideo and studied composition at the Montevideo Conservatory and the Latin-American Center for Musical Studies of the Instituto Torcuato di Tella in Buenos Aires from 1969 to 1970 with Carlos Estrada and Héctor Tosar.

She took a teaching position in 1974 at the National Conservatory in Caracas, Venezuela, then returned to Uruguay in 1998 to teach at the Escuela Universitaria de Música and at the Escuela Municipal de Música. She is noted as a specialist in contemporary tango.

== Selected works ==
- Joropo for clarinet quartet
- Montevideo piece Number 3 for orchestra
- Merengue for clarinet quartet
