= Beatriz Monteiro (actress) =

Portuguese actress (born 1999)

- Born: Beatriz Gonçalves Monteiro; February 23, 1999 (age 27); Lisbon, Portugal
- Citizenship: Portuguese
- Occupation: Actress
- Years active: 2006–present

Beatriz Gonçalves Monteiro (born February 23, 1999) is a Portuguese actress. She gained prominence when interpreting Lua and Vitória in the series Chiquititas and Floribella. Among several projects, she rose to national fame by participating in Pai à Força for almost 4 years.

She is currently studding Theatre Arts in London.

== Career ==
She started to work as an actress in 2006 and is also very successful at a theatrical level.

== Filmography ==
=== TV ===
- 2017 - Espelho d'Água, SIC
- 2017 - (Ana Augusta), Ministério do Tempo, RTP
- 2016/7 - (Marta), A Filha da Lei, RTP
- 2016 - Mulheres Assim, RTP
- 2015 - Terapia, RTP
- 2015 - Coração d'Ouro, SIC
- 2015 - Poderosas, SIC
- 2014 - Água de Mar, RTP
- 2013 - (Madalena), Destinos Cruzados, TVI
- 2012 - Vá Cavar Batatas, RTP
- 2010 - (Mafalda), Maternidade, RTP
- 2008 to 2011 - (Beatriz), Pai à Força, RTP
- 2007/8 - (Lua), Chiquititas, SIC
- 2006 - (Vitória), Floribella, SIC
- 2006 - Mundo Catita, RTP

=== Cinema ===
- 2010 - Moi Bernardette J'ai vu!
- 2010 - Filme do Desassossego
- 2008 - O Dez - (Sofia)
- 2007 - A Arte de Roubar - (Laurita)
- 2007 - O Julgamento - (Joana)
