= Beatriz Mejia-Krumbein =

Colombian artist

- Born: 1945 (age 80–81); Medellin, Colombia
- Known for: Painting
- Movement: Expressionism

Beatriz Mejia-Krumbein (born 1945) is a Colombian artist. For a number of years, she served as an art professor at La Sierra University in Riverside, California.

== Biography ==
Mejia-Krumbein was born in Medellin, Colombia, an area that according to Phoebe Farris was "steeped in the Catholic religion combined with native Indian mythology." Mejia-Krumbein studied the fine arts in Colombia before she earned an M.F.A. at James Madison University. In 1987, after living a number of countries, including Germany and Mexico, she immigrated to the United States.

For seventeen years, she served as an art professor at La Sierra University in Riverside, California, as well as the director of the university's Brandstater Gallery. She is currently retired.

== Career ==
In 1996, Mejia-Krumbein was featured in a Public Broadcast Service film for the Shenandoah Valley in Virginia. In 1981, she was also featured in a 16mm film in Germany. Besides devoting her life to education, Mejia-Krumbein received numerous awards, such as the second prize in the First National Bank, Cleburne 20th Annual Art Exhibition in 1988. She was also awarded the New Market Arts and Crafts Scholarship in 1991. In 1997, one of her art work was selected to exhibit in the Library and Research Center by the National Museum of the Woman in the Arts in Washington, D.C.

== Artistic style ==
In her early artistic career, Mejia-Krumbein was influenced by the environment in which she had grown up, as well as the unique ways in which area storytellers told their tales. During La Violencia, she grew interested in Expressionism, especially German Expressionists. She also was inspired by the art of the Spanish romantic painter Francisco Goya. Her art piece associated with chaos, dirt.

Mejia-Krumbein also eager to observe human behaviour and have deeper insight to it. By using black and white, depicting a contradictory relationship within her works. Such contrast expressions elicits her complex viewpoint on human behaviour. She believes that color is not necessary for her interpretation. Through using violence brush strokes and attacks on canvas, to depict a sense of lacking resistance by people to the dominant traditions and systems.

== Publication ==
- “El Arte de Beatrix Krumbein es un encuentro con Latinoamerica”, El Norte, 1986
- “Art. La Obra de Beatrix.” Revista Escuela de Cadetes “General Santander”, no. 67, 1995

== Bibliography ==
- Farris, Phoebe, ed. (1999). Women Artists of Color: A Bio-Critical Sourcebook to 20th Century Artists in the Americas. Westport, CT: Greenwood Press. ISBN 0313303746.
