= Beatriz Maggi =

Cuban writer

Beatriz María Maggi Bethencourt
- Born: 27 February 1924; Puerto Padre, Las Tunas, Cuba
- Died: May 26, 2017 (aged 93); Havana
- Education: University of Havana; Wellesley College
- Occupation(s): professor literary critic
- Awards: National Critics Award; Rafael Mendive Medal

Beatriz María Maggi Bethencourt (27 February 1924 - 26 May 2017) was a Cuban essayist, professor, and literary critic. Maggi was considered one of the most prominent Spanish-speaking academics studying Shakespeare in the 20th century.

== Life and education ==
Beatriz Maggi was born in Puerto Padre, Las Tunas, Cuba, on 27 February 1924. Her father was a prominent dentist who had immigrated to Cuba from Venezuela, and her mother had immigrated from Spain. Her brother, Horacio Maggi Bethencourt, was a well-known Cuban painter and designer. When she was 17, Maggi met Ezequiel Vieta, who was a playwright and storyteller. They later married. They had two children together.

In 1946, Maggi graduated with a Bachelor's degree in Philosophy and Letters from the University of Havana. In 1948, she received a Master's degree in English and American literature from Wellesley College in Massachusetts. She received a Doctorate in Philological Sciences from the University of Havana in 1967.

Maggi died in Havana on 26 May 2017, at the age of 93.

== Career ==
Beatriz Maggi worked as a translator, writer, essayist, and professor. She taught at various schools in Cuba, later becoming a professor at the University of Havana, where she co-founded and acted as chair of the Department of Universal Literature. While working as a professor, Maggi also spoke at international conferences. She retired in 1993.

=== Selected publications ===
Maggi was the author of numerous titles, including the following:

- Panfleto y literatura (Letras Cubanas, 1982).
- El cambio histórico en William Shakespeare (Letras Cubanas, 1985).
- El pequeño drama de la lectura (Letras Cubanas, 1988).
- La voz de la escritura (Letras Cubanas, 1998).
- Antología de ensayos (Instituto Cubano del Libro, 2008)
- La palabra conducente (Letras Cubanas, 2013).

== Awards and honors ==
Maggi received many awards during her lifetime, including the National Critics Award, the highest editorial award in Cuba, and the Rafael Mendive Medal, which is awarded to notable professors and academics in the country. Maggi was an honorary member of the National Union of Writers and Artists of Cuba (UNEAC) and the Cuban Pedagogues Association.

She was recipient of the Artium Magistrae, and she was considered an eminent translator of writers such as Emily Dickinson and William Shakespeare in Cuba. She was nicknamed "The Cuban 'girlfriend' of Shakespeare" by her contemporaries.
