= Beatriz Bernal =

16th-century Spanish writer

- Born: 1501–1504; Valladolid, Spain
- Died: c. 1563
- Known for: Chivalric romance Cristalián de España

Beatriz Bernal (between 1501 and 1504 – c. 1563) was a Spanish writer, the author of Cristalián de España, and one of the first women in Spain who could be considered a professional writer.

== Life ==
Bernal was born between 1501 and 1504, in Valladolid, to a wealthy family. Twice widowed, she earned a living by way of renting rooms. She died around 1563.

== Work ==
In 1537, Bernal applied to the royal court to print her only known work, the chivalric romance Cristalián de España (full title: Historia de los invictos y magnánimos caballeros don Cristalián de España, príncipe de Trapisonda, y del infante Luzescanio, su hermano, hijos del famosísimo emperador Londelec de Trapisonda). The book was finally published under a pseudonym in 1545, with a dedication to Philip II of Spain. In her work, Bernal created many and varied female characters and gave them more agency than was common in the genre. It was the first chivalric romance written by a woman, and possibly the only one written by one. Its Italian translation was published in 1558.

Cristalián de España was reprinted posthumously by Juana de Gatos, the daughter of Bernal, this time under the full name of the author, which made Bernal belatedly the first professional woman writer in Spain.

In 2025, Cristalián de España was adapted for young readers by Diego Arboleda, who created an illustrated version titled Las aventuras del caballero Cristalián (The Adventures of Cristalián the Knight). The children's author also included Bernal as a character in his earlier work, Una librería en el bosque.
