= Paula Beatriz =

Brazilian activist and educator

Paula Beatriz de Souza Cruz
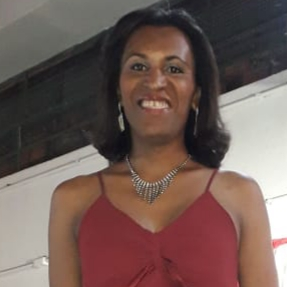
- Born: Paula Beatriz de Souza Cruz; 31 January 1971 (age 55); Taboão da Serra, São Paulo, Brazil
- Occupation: Teacher; school principal; activist

Paula Beatriz de Souza Cruz (Taboão da Serra, 31 January 1971) is an educator, school principal and Brazilian activist for the rights of the LGBTQ population. She is responsible for the administration of the Santa Rosa de Lima State School, in Capão Redondo, in the South Zone of São Paulo, a position she has held since 2013.

She was the first trans principal of a public school in São Paulo. She paved the way for the inclusion of the preferred names of students who are transgender and travestis in attendance lists and class diaries.

== Career in education ==
Paula Beatriz has been an educator for more than 30 years. She graduated in pedagogy and post-graduated in educational management, by Unicamp, and in Teaching in Higher Education, by Universidade Estácio de Sá.

She started her career as a teacher at 18 years old. She has been teaching in the state education network of São Paulo since 1989, when she first joined the Presidente Kennedy State School. In 2003, she became the principal of the E.E. Santa Rosa de Lima, with 1,000 students from the 1st to the 5th grade of elementary school and 70 teachers and staff.

== Activism ==
Paula has organized several activities about the LGBT movement in her school and in the community. In the school, she led studies and discussions about LGBT people in the educational system. In the community, she has given lectures in various conferences, such as TODXS Conecta and the Congress on People Management of the Public Sector of São Paulo. Moreover, she is active and recognized in the Afro-Brazilian community.

In 2012, affiliated to the Socialism and Liberty Party, she ran for the position of councilwoman, for the municipality of São Paulo becoming a substitute.

== Awards and honors ==
She has been recognized for her trajectory and her activism in various instances.

In 2014 she won the 1st Telma Lipp Award - category Education, at the IX Southeast Meeting of Travestis and Transexuals.

In 2016 she won the Claudia Wonder Award, at the 4th SPTransvisão - in celebration of 29 January, Trans Visibility Day. Also in 2016 she won the Diversity Award - 5th Edition, in the category Transexual Personality. In 2017 the Ministry of Education, the State Secretariat of Education of São Paulo, the 1st Magazine of ABRAPEE (Brazilian Association of Professionals and Specialists in Education) and the UOL on line Magazine published a report recognizing her as the 1st Transexual Principal of the State Education Network of São Paulo.

In 2018 she was a speaker at the Cycle Educate Today - The different childhoods in the territory, held by SESC- São Paulo. and honored by the State Secretariat of Education of São Paulo for her remarkable participation in the category Sexual and Gender Diversity.

In 2019, she received the Ruth de Souza Award, offered by the State Council for Participation and Development of the Black Community of São Paulo (CPDCN), from the Secretariat of Justice and Citizenship. The award celebrates Afro-Brazilian leaders. Also in 2019, she was honored during the solemn act organized by deputy Carlos Giannazi, at the ALESP, for her LGBTQIA+ activism.

In 2021, she received the Darcy Ribeiro Education Award, granted by the Education Commission of the Chamber of Deputies. Also in 2021, one of the alleys of Jardim Mitsutani, in Capão Redondo, was named "Teacher Paula Beatriz", by initiative of the residents themselves.

On 28 June 2022, the São Paulo City Council, by initiative of councilwoman Erika Hilton, granted her the title of Citizen of São Paulo.

== Personal life ==
She was born into a modest family, in a municipality on the outskirts of the São Paulo Metropolitan Region, receiving the name of Paulo. Her mother separated from her father when the couple's six children were still young.

Her childhood and adolescence were marked by several discoveries - among them, that she was a trans woman and that she wanted to be a teacher.

At 9 years old, Paulo was taken to a psychiatrist, by recommendation of the school. The diagnosis was "homosexuality", a condition that, at the time, was considered a disease by the World Health Organization, and only ceased to appear in the ICD (International Statistical Classification of Diseases and Related Health Problems) in 1990. She was put on medications and, consequently, her performance at school dropped and her behavior changed. This continued until her mother, Beatriz, decided to end the young boy's ordeal and made a drastic decision: she threw all the drugs in the toilet. She felt that she would rather have a gay son than a crazy or unhappy one. Beatriz was a school cleaner. She later became the caretaker of the Presidente Kennedy State School and the family lived there for about seven years, while their own house was being built. Paula Beatriz remembers that she liked to go to the library. "During the holidays, I also helped in the secretariat, since my handwriting was good. When I decided to be a teacher, many discouraged me, saying that it was a profession that paid very poorly. At 18 years old, I started teaching children and adults and, in 1989, I started teaching. I graduated in pedagogy, did post-graduation in educational management and in teaching in higher education." She always had a good relationship with her family and refers to her previous image as that of her "twin brother". She does not get rid of old photos, nor tries to forget her past.

=== Gender transition ===
In 2007, she started the medical process for sex reassignment surgery. Prior to her gender transition, Paula was a coordinator, instructor and principal. Her transformation was completed while she was still a principal. She felt comfortable during her transition, partly because of the support of her colleagues and students. For this reason, she makes an effort to support other transitioning people in the school community throughout the process. In 2013, she rectified her documents to female gender and changed her civil name to Paula Beatriz de Souza Cruz.

== Filmography ==
- My Body is Political, documentary by Alice Riff, with Fernando Ribeiro, Giu Nonato, Linn da Quebrada and Paula Beatriz.
- Transgente (2019), documentary series broadcast by Canal Brasil, in six episodes of 30'. Direction by Adriana Dutra and Malu de Martino
