= Beatriz Santos Arrascaeta =

Uruguayan writer, educator and singer

Beatriz Santos Arrascaeta (born January 20, 1947) is a Uruguayan writer, educator, singer and activist of African descent.

She was born in Montevideo, growing up in the Buceo barrio, and is the niece of poet Juan Julio Arrascaeta. After completing high school, she first worked as a housekeeper. In 1977, she began working in children's theatre. Later, she performed musical theatre with New York director Ellen Stewart and then performed candombe with the theatre group Odin Teatret. After taking part in a workshop on Black America in 1980, she began to lecture on the culture and history of the black community in Uruguay. During the 1980s, she produced a number of radio shows about Afro-Uruguayan culture. She was elected to the Uruguayan Committee against Apartheid and, in 1986, she was named cultural exchange coordinator between Brazil and Uruguay. She also wrote articles for the Uruguayan periodical Mundo afro. She founded Centro Cultural por la Paz y la Integración (CECPUI), an organization aimed at improving the situation of black Uruguayans. Santos lives in Montevideo.

== Selected works ==
- Historias de vida: negros en el Uruguay, collected narratives (1994) with Teresa Porzecanski
- Africa en el Rio de la Plata, history (1995) with Nene Loriaga
- La herencia cultural africana en las Américas, collected essays (1998)
