= Paulete Furacão =

- Born: April 13, 1984 (age 42); Salvador, Bahia, Brazil
- Other name: Paola Beatriz
- Education: Federal University of Bahia
- Occupation: Parliamentary advisor

Paola Beatriz (Salvador, 13 April 1984), also known as Paulete Furacão, is a Brazilian LGBTQ activist. She was the first transgender person to hold public office in the state of Bahia.

She is a parliamentary advisor to Bahia state representative Olívia Santana and studies pedagogy at the Federal University of Bahia (UFBA). She also works as a social educator combating human trafficking and preventing sexually transmitted infections.

== Biography ==
Furacão was born on 13 April 1984, in the city of Salvador, Bahia. At the age of five, she came out as a transgender woman. Her family accepted her, but she suffered prejudice from friends and strangers.

She began her activism in the LGBTQ movement in 2004, following the murder of her travesti friend Laleska de Caprid on Christmas Day. She then founded the Laleska de Caprid Association in 2006, named in honor of her friend. According to her, her social name, Paulete Furacão, was chosen as a symbol of "self-affirmation, resistance, and power."

From 2012 to 2016, Furacão held the position of coordinator of the Center for the Defense of the Rights of the LGBTT Population (Lesbians, Gays, Bisexuals, Travestis and Transsexuals), at the State Secretariat of Justice, Citizenship and Human Rights (SJCDH) of the government of Bahia.

In 2018, she hosted the program Close de Favela on radio station 87.9 FM in Salvador, where she addressed LGBTQ issues.

In 2019, through a joint effort by the Public Defender's Office of the State of Bahia, Furacão obtained her birth certificate with her current legal name, Paola Beatriz.

In 2021, she became a member of the Oportunizar Project, a project of the Trans Network that aims to promote employability for transgender people in Brazil.

== See also ==
- Grupo Gay da Bahia
- LGBTQ rights in Bahia
