= Beatriz García Vasallo =

Spanish academic

- Born: Spain
- Scientific career
- Fields: Physics
- Institutions: Universidad de Salamanca

Beatriz García Vasallo (scientific name: B. G. Vasallo or B. García-Vasallo) is a Spanish professor, researcher, and scientist communicator. She serves as an associate professor in the area of Electronics in the Department of Applied Physics at the University of Salamanca (USAL).

Her contributions to the scientific field focus on the modelling and the characterization of III-V devices, as well as noise modelling in neuromorphic systems. She has participated in several academic events and scientific popularization festivals such as the Pint of Science. Additionally, she has authored various publications on topics related to Physics and Chemistry for general audiences, such as in the newspaper Current Pamplona, and on the publishing platform The Conversation.

== Biography ==
She graduated with a degree in physics from the University of Salamanca in 2000 and received her PhD in 2005, earning the extraordinary doctorate award from the same university. She conducted a research stay at the Institut d'Electronique, of Microélectronique et of Nanotechnologies (IEMN), France for two years, where she completed her postdoctoral studies.

Since 2018, she has been an Associated Professor at the University of Salamanca in the department of Applied Physics. She is a member of the NANO-ELEC research group, which focuses on high-frequency nanoelectronic devices at the University of Salamanca.

Her research papers primarily investigate the static, dynamic and noise behavior of III-V semiconductors devices using Monte Carlo models. In recent years, her scientific interest have extended to applying typical semiconductor models to study ion transport across biological membranes for bio-inspired semiconductor applications.

=== Research and Academic Activity ===
She has authored or co-authored over 30 scientific articles and 55 conference papers, 20 of which have been peer-reviewed, and has contributed to one book. She has also participated in several research projects funded by various institutions, including the European Commission, the Ministry of Education and Science, and the Junta de Castilla y León.

In her teaching activities, she received an overall rating of excellent in the Docentia program (2021–2022). She has also engaged in scientific dissemination activities, including Pint of Science (2018) and +Physical seminars organized by the local section of the Spanish Royal Physics Physics Society (2023). She served as deputy director of University Extension at the Polytechnic School of Zamora (University of Salamanca) between 2016 and 2020.
