= Beatriz del Cueto =

Architect born in Cuba, resident of Puerto Rico

Beatriz Del Cueto López-Hidalgo
- Born: Beatriz del Cueto López-Hidalgo; 1952 (age 73–74); Havana, Cuba
- Other name: Beatriz del Cueto de Pantel
- Occupation: preservation architect
- Years active: 1984 – present
- Known for: restoration of the Iglesia San José
- Spouse: Agamemnon Pantel

Beatriz Del Cueto López-Hidalgo (born 1952) is a Cuban-born architect specialising in conservation and architectural preservation. A resident of Puerto Rico since 1960, del Cueto is a Fellow of the American Academy in Rome, Fellow of the American Institute of Architects, and Henry Klumb Award winner in 2012.

== Biography ==
Beatriz del Cueto López-Hidalgo was born in 1952 in Havana, Cuba and moved with her family to Puerto Rico in 1960. She studied architecture at the University of Florida in Gainesville graduating in 1974. She then went on to further her studies at the Preservation Institute of Nantucket, specializing in historical preservation and architectural conservation. In 1976, she obtained a Master's in Architecture with a focus on preservation from the University of Florida and then moved to Puerto Rico. In 1977, she began working for Henry Klumb and after three years left his office to work at the State Historic Preservation Office.

In 1984, she moved to Rome, Italy and studied with her husband Agamemnon Pantel at the International Centre for the Study of the Preservation and Restoration of Cultural Property (ICCROM). Between 1984 and 1986 Cueto worked at the College of Architects of Puerto Rico, leaving to establish a private practice in 1986. In 1990, she joined with her husband in the firm of Pantel del Cueto & Associates which focuses on facilitating a better understanding of traditional architecture in the Caribbean region. Their conservation projects have gained recognition both inside and outside of Puerto Rico. In addition to managing a practice in San Juan, del Cueto founded the Architectural Conservation Laboratory at the Polytechnic University of Puerto Rico where she provides courses in the theory of conservation and the scientific analysis of building materials.

In 2011, del Cueto was awarded the Rome Prize by the American Academy in Rome and utilized her research prize to investigate concrete and its historic use in buildings. In 2012 she received Puerto Rico's most important architecture prize, the Henry Klumb Award, for her teaching and significant contribution to the restoration and preservation of the island's historic landmarks.

== Projects ==
=== Cape San Juan Light in Fajardo ===
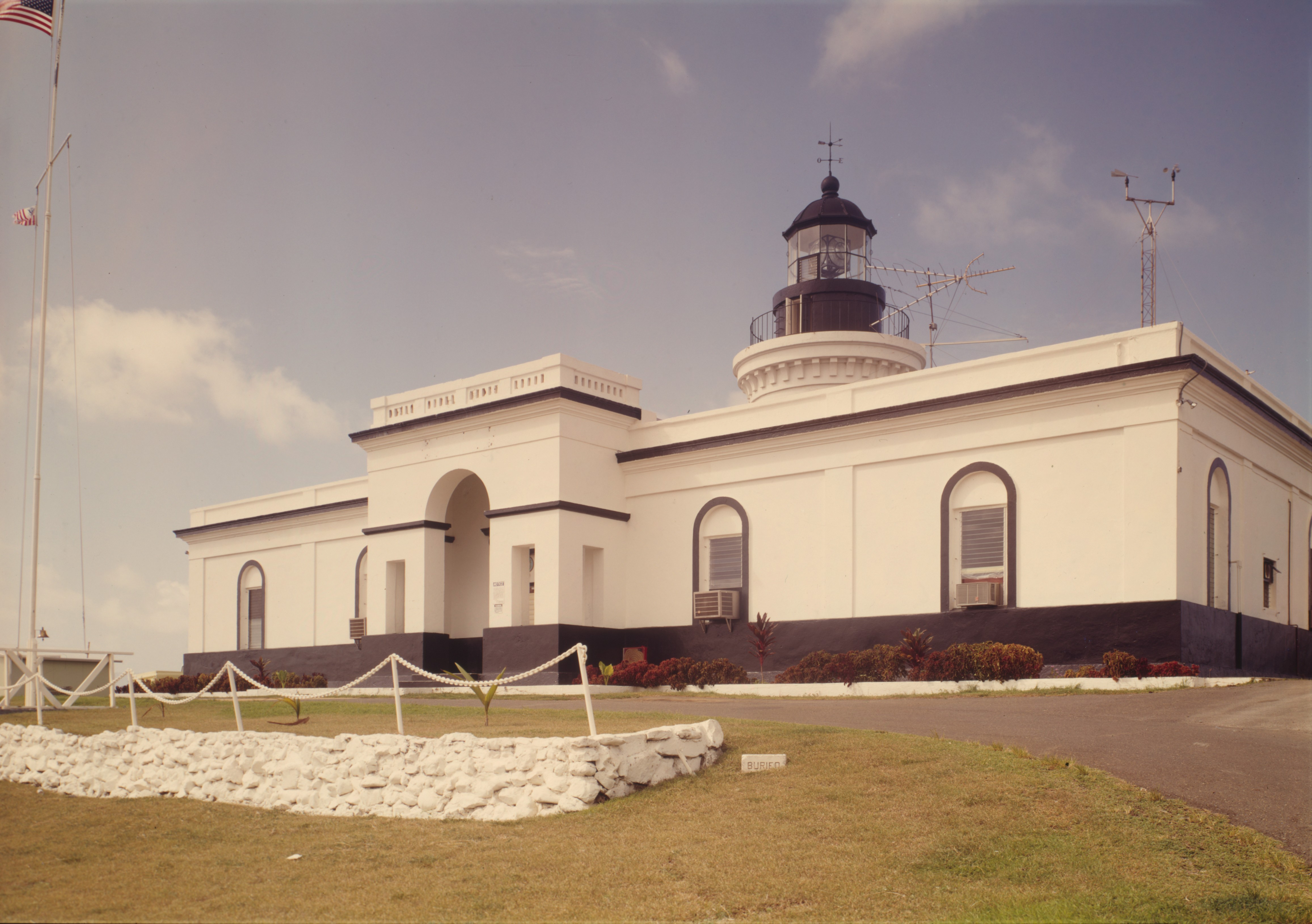
Cape San Juan Light

The full project consisted of restoring 15 lighthouses of Puerto Rico, which were in varying states of decay. As the priority was architectural conservation, Cueto's first step was to analyze the history of the lighthouses. They were built between 1880 and 1882 by the Spanish Government in a style of masonry common in traditional Puerto Rican building. The walls are made of limestone, sand and lime, with horizontal rows of mud bricks and feature flat roofs of wooden beams with rafters in three layers. The outermost roof was utilized to channel water to the cistern for drinking water. After the Spanish–American War of 1898, the lighthouses became the property of the United States Lighthouse Service, which would later be part of the United States Coast Guard and they remained in use until the 1970s. They had been vacant for about ten years when the restoration project was launched in 1988.

Del Cueto's major lighthouse restoration work covered the Cape San Juan Light (Faro de Las Cabezas de San Juan) in Fajardo, the oldest of Puerto Rico's lighthouses. The one-story stone, neoclassical style keeper's house is attached to a cylindrical stone tower, which originally had a third-order beam. The original 19-mile scope was expanded to 25 miles during the renovation. Restoration also included reclaiming the system of channels and water collection system for the cistern, which now is used not for drinking water but to supply the bathrooms with water. The lighthouse is located in the Cabezas de San Juan Nature Reserve and once it was restored it was opened for tours. One portion of the keeper's house was designated as a marine laboratory for the Universidad de Puerto Rico en Humacao, which required bringing the buildings up to current fire and safety codes. The preservation project was not completed until 1991.

=== Iglesia San José ===
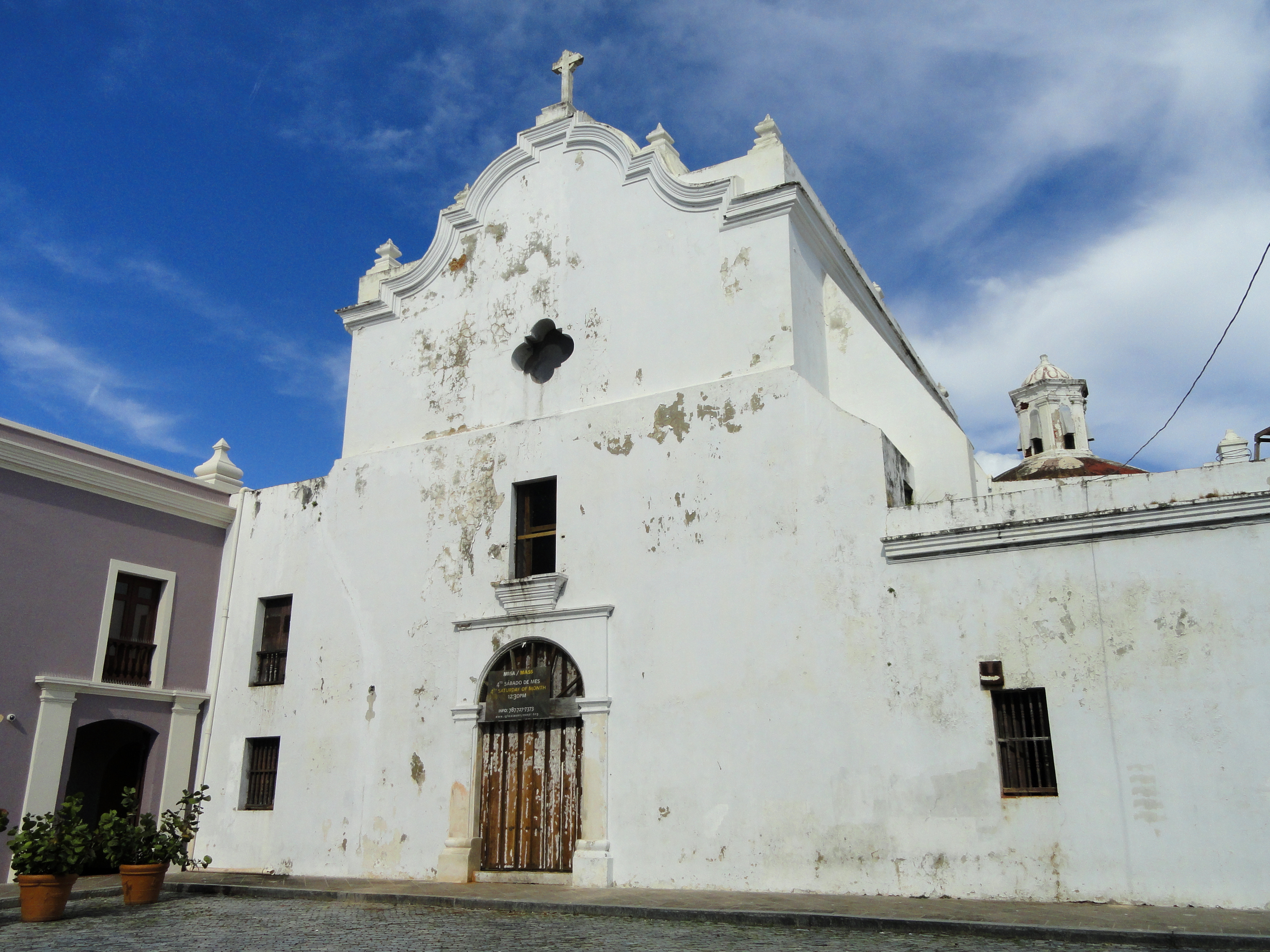
Iglesia de San José

San José Church (Iglesia de San José) is a sixteenth-century structure, in Old San Juan, Puerto Rico which was closed in 2002 due to structural destabilization and in 2003, Cueto's firm began assessing the damage to the property. The immediate issue was prevention of further deterioration of the site and to assist in that effort, it was placed on the World Monuments Watch List in 2004. In the assessment phase, Cueto used ground-penetrating radar, one of the first such uses of that technology in the Caribbean. The technology allows assessment without invasive testing which might result in further damage to the site and gives insight into subsurface conditions which may not be visible. The series of analysis took place over a four-year period identifying multiple renovations and alterations over the 478 years of life of the structure. Once the assessment phase completed, conservation and repairs began which were not completed until 2012.

== Works ==
- Faro Las Cabezas de San Juan, Fajardo
- Headquarters of the College of Architects Puerto Rico, Santurce
- Mansion housing the Conservation Trust of Puerto Rico, Old San Juan
- Old Girls Asylum, Miramar
- Conservatory of Music of Puerto Rico, Miramar
- Old Provincial Secondary School, known as the Department of Health, Santurce
- Hacienda La Esperanza, Manatí
- Church of San José, Old San Juan

== Selected publications ==
- del Cueto López-Hidalgo, Beatriz (1976). El Seminario Conciliar de San Ildefonso: cradle of higher education in Puerto Rico: adaptive use study (Master’s). Gainesville, Florida: University of Florida. OCLC 22193864.
- del Cueto de Pantel, Beatriz (September 1986). "La Intervención en un Edificio Histórico: Los Conceptos Fundamentales". Plastica Revista (in Spanish). 2 (15). La Liga de Arte de San Juan: 78–82.
- del Cueto, Beatriz (1997). A manual on conservation methodology for historic buildings & structures, Puerto Rico and the Virgin Islands. Guaynabo, Puerto Rico: Caribbean Heritage, Inc. OCLC 39287147.
- del Cueto, Beatriz (2012). The Rescue of Iglesia de San José – transdisciplinary investigations and analysis prior to Conservation (Report). Pantel, del Cueto & Associates. pp. 1–27.
- del Cueto, Beatriz (17 September 2013). "¿Escombros o material de reciclaje?". Construcción (in Spanish). Arquetectura: 36–37.
- del Cueto, Beatriz (2013). Mother Nature versus Puerto Rican Building Technologies (Report). pp. 1–19.
