= Wasserman (company) =

American marketing and talent management company

The Team
- Formerly: Wasserman Media Group
- Type: Private
- Founded: 2002; 24 years ago
- Founder: Casey Wasserman
- Headquarters: Los Angeles, California, United States
- Area served: Worldwide
- Key people: Casey Wasserman (CEO); Shelley Pisarra (EVP, Global Insights); Tom Windish (EVP, Business Development)
- Divisions: Wasserman Global Football; Wasserman Music
- Subsidiaries: trevor//peter; Laundry Service (247LS); CSM Sport & Entertainment
- Website: the.team

THE TEAM (stylized as THE·TEAM; formerly known as Wasserman Media Group and Wasserman) is a marketing and talent management company based in Los Angeles. It was founded in 2002 by sports and entertainment agent Casey Wasserman.

== History ==
Wasserman Media Group (WMG) was founded in 2002.

In 2002, Wasserman acquired sports marketing and naming-rights company Envision then, in 2005, action sports representation firm The Familie.

In 2004, Wasserman purchased 411 Productions and a few months later relaunched it as Studio 411, a sports entertainment film studio. The business was designed to provide financing, obtain sponsorships and arrange distribution in support of original productions. The company also made an unsuccessful bid to sign up enough athletes in BMX, skateboarding and freestyle motocross to form PGA-like sanctioning bodies in those sports.

In January 2006, Wasserman acquired the NBA and MLB sports agent business of Arn Tellem. Several of Tellem's sports agent colleagues also joined the company as part of the deal. Until he retired in June 2015, Tellem was a principal at the company and ran one of its management groups.

In November 2006, the company acquired soccer agency SFX in the UK. Through that acquisition, Wasserman came to represent players including Steven Gerrard, Robbie Keane, Jamie Carragher, Michael Owen, Tim Cahill, Jonathan Woodgate, Alex Morgan, Tobin Heath, Heather O'Reilly, Wes Brown, Scott Parker, Jack Wilshere, Park Ji-Sung, Shay Given, Tim Howard and Emile Heskey.

In June 2007, WMG acquired Raleigh, North Carolina–based OnSport. From 2007-11, Sarah Hirshland (who would later become CEO of the United States Olympic Committee) was a senior vice president for strategic business development, managing the insurance firm Nationwide account, and negotiating deals with NASCAR, the USTA, and the PGA Tour.

In early 2011, WMG bought London-based media rights manager and advisory firm Reel Enterprises. That April, Wasserman expanded its golf talent roster by acquiring SFX Golf.

In 2015, WMG acquired Laundry Service, which included Cycle, a network of social media influencers. The advertising agency was named one of the Ad Age agencies to watch in January 2015. In 2016, as the company expanded its services, WMG rebranded its agency name to Wasserman.

In 2019, Wasserman secured more than $200 million in commissions. This made them the second most profitable sports agency that year. Wasserman also became the first agency to have a client selected in the first round of all six of North America’s major team sports drafts that year. In 2020, Wasserman earned $331 million in commissions and signed $5.7 billion in contracts. This made them the second most valuable sports agency once again.

In March 2021, Wasserman acquired German based boxing promotional company Team Sauerland. With the announcement, they revealed the company would be relocating to the United Kingdom and subsequently renamed to "Wasserman Boxing". Wasserman also acquired the North American Music division of the Los Angeles–based Paradigm Talent Agency.

In 2021, Wasserman also acquired Paradigm Agency's music business. The acquisition of Paradigm led to Wasserman’s launch of its music division, Wasserman Music. In April 2021, Wasserman acquired the Boston-based marketing agency Riddle & Bloom.

In 2022, Wasserman acquired Jet Sports, a baseball representation agency. That same year, Wasserman Baseball agents signed more than $500 million in Major League Baseball contracts. In January of 2022, Wasserman acquired The Montag Group, a representation agency for athletes which also represented notable speakers. Following that acquisition, Wasserman launched Wasserman Speakers in 2023 to represent public speakers.

In 2023, Wasserman bought the management production company, Brillstein Entertainment Partners. The business division Wasserman Ventures was also launched in 2023, officially expanding the agency into the entertainment industry. That same year, Wasserman acquired Caric Sports Management (CSM) and Squadra Sports Management. The Wasserman agency acquired Toronto based trevor//peter in 2023 as well. The launch of Wasserman Creators also took place in 2023, further expanding the agency’s talent pool.

In 2024, Wasserman acquired Sherman-Oaks based Long Haul management, a creative agency which brought over a roster of YouTube, sports, and gaming clients. The agency also acquired Canadian based Momentum Hockey, Volante Sports, and London based International Football Management in 2024.

In April of 2025, Wasserman was appointed as sales agency of record by WTA Ventures, the commercial arm of the Women’s Tennis Association. In August of 2025, Wasserman signed British rock group Muse.

The agency acquired KO Sports in 2025, an agency representing athletes from the National Hockey League. Wasserman acquired Bluemedia in 2025, which was responsible for the branding and signage of Super Bowl LIX in New Orleans.

In November 2025, Wasserman confirmed it was in talks to sell its boxing promotion division, Wasserman Boxing. As part of the sale, Wasserman's 25% stake in Misfits Boxing would also be included.

In February 2026, Casey Wasserman announced that he was selling the company. In March 2026, the company announced that it would be renamed THE•TEAM or The Team. On March 18, Wasserman Boxing was confirmed to be sold and rebranded into MF Sports.

== Controversies ==
=== John Schnatter lawsuit ===
In December 2019, Papa John's founder John Schnatter filed a lawsuit against advertising agency, Laundry Service, and its parent company, Wasserman Media Group. The legal action stemmed from a May 2018 recorded conference call organized by Laundry Service for media training during which Schnatter used a racial slur against Black people. Following publication of the call's contents by Forbes, Schnatter resigned as chairman of the company, subsequently suing Laundry Service and Wasserman, alleging that the call was intentionally leaked following a dispute over a $6 million payment.

=== Francisco Rodriguez lawsuit (2011–2012) ===
In 2011, Major League Baseball relief pitcher Francisco Rodríguez filed a lawsuit against WMG and two of its prominent baseball agents, Arn Tellem and Paul Kinzer, alleging agent malpractice and fraud. The lawsuit claimed that his agents failed to submit his contractually-stipulated no-trade list to the New York Mets prior to his July 2011 trade to the Milwaukee Brewers and that WMG agents had repeatedly and falsely assured Rodriguez that the list had been filed with the team. The lawsuit was settled out of court in November 2012.

=== Casey Wasserman and Ghislaine Maxwell affiliation and fallout ===
Following the release of Epstein files in January 2026 which revealed that Casey Wasserman had exchanged emails with Ghislaine Maxwell in 2003, several artists represented by Wasserman denounced Casey Wasserman and called for his resignation. Artists including Bbno$, Bully, Chappell Roan, Chelsea Cutler, Dropkick Murphys, Gigi Perez, Hippo Campus, Lane 8, Laufey, Local Natives, Odesza, Orville Peck, Sylvan Esso, Water from Your Eyes, Wednesday, and Weyes Blood severed ties with the company.
