= Sarah Hirshland =

Sports executive

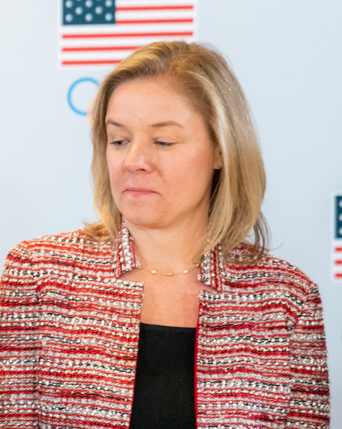
- Born: Sarah Caitlin McDougall; 1975 (age 50–51); Silverthorne, Colorado, U.S.
- Education: Duke University (B.S. biology 1997)
- Occupation: sports executive
- Years active: 1997–present
- Employer: United States Olympic & Paralympic Committee
- Title: Chief Executive Officer
- Term: 2018–present

Sarah Hirshland (born in 1975) is the chief executive officer of the United States Olympic & Paralympic Committee. From 2011 to 2018, she was a senior managing director and the chief commercial officer of the U.S. Golf Association.

== Early life ==
Hirshland was born Sarah Caitlin McDougall, in Silverthorne, Colorado. She moved with her parents to Durango, Colorado, and Littleton, Colorado, when she was young. She attended and in 1992 graduated from Kent Denver School high school, where she played for the girls' state soccer champions in 1990 to 1991. In 2019, she was honored with the school's Distinguished Alumni Award.

Hirshland attended Duke University, graduating in 1997 with a B.S. in biology. At the time, she hoped to become a sports medicine doctor for her hometown Denver Broncos.

== Career ==
=== Early career (1997–2011) ===
In 1997, she began her career joining in the founding of Total Sports, a now defunct online sports digital media company, as general manager. It was then acquired by Quokka Sports.

In 2001, after Total Sports closed, she joined sports consulting and marketing firm OnSport, as senior vice president and one of its first employees. In 2007, talent agency and sports marketing company Wasserman Media Group (WMG) acquired OnSport. At WMG, she was a senior vice president for strategic business development, and was the company's lead on its account for the insurance firm Nationwide, and negotiated deals with NASCAR, the USTA, and the PGA Tour. She also represented American Express, Nationwide, Nokia, Scotts, and Wachovia.

=== US Golf Association (2011–18) ===
In 2011, Hirshland left to become the senior managing director of business affairs for the U.S. Golf Association (USGA). In April 2018, she was promoted to chief commercial officer, in charge of merchandising, communications, marketing, global media and content distribution, corporate partnerships, merchandise and licensing, and community outreach. She brought the USGA partnerships with major corporations and negotiated a billion-dollar deal with the Fox TV network.

=== 2018–19 ===
US Olympic Committee logo

In August 2018, Hirshland was named the 20th chief executive officer of the United States Olympic Committee (United States Olympic & Paralympic Committee since 2019), and its first female CEO, overseeing both the National Olympic Committee and National Paralympic Committee for the U.S. Unlike most countries, the U.S. Olympic team does not receive any government money, but U.S. lawmakers still have ultimate authority over the USOC via the Ted Stevens Act. In her position she makes $600,000 a year, with a chance for a bonus of up to 50 percent, and handles relationships with 43 domestic Olympic sports organizations, as well as thousands of athletes, donors, fans, and the International Olympic Committee (IOC).

Her task upon taking her job was also to restore credibility to the USOC's effort to provide safety for its athletes after a number of sex-abuse scandals, including the USA Gymnastics sex abuse scandal. Hirshland said: "We, the Olympic community, collectively failed our athletes. It's a terrible, terrible situation. It goes beyond gymnastics and, quite frankly, goes beyond sports."

In September 2018, after USA Gymnastics hired longtime coach Mary Lee Tracy to be its elite development director for women, Tracy was heavily criticized for initially defending sexual molester team doctor Larry Nassar and fired; Hirshland weighed in by saying that it was "time to consider making adjustments in the leadership" of U.S.A. Gymnastics; two days later, USA Gymnastics president Kerry Perry was forced to resign.

In December 2018, Hirshland fired the USOC chief of sport performance Alan Ashley, after a report found that he knew of accusations against Nassar more than a year before they became public knowledge, and deserved blame for his inaction and attempts to keep the accusations against Nassar quiet. That month, Hirshland said: "I would love to believe there will never be a bad guy, but there are going to be bad guys and bad girls. And we have to make sure that when there are, we very quickly have systems in place to find them, weed them out and get rid of them."

=== 2020–present ===
In February 2022, the IOC took the unusual step of saying that at the 2022 Beijing Winter Olympics Russian figure skater Kamila Valieva would be allowed to continue to compete despite failing a doping test, but that there would not be an awards ceremony if she won events and medals would not be handed out until her case was resolved, because of lingering doubts about her eligibility. Hirshland said: "We are disappointed by the message this sends. This appears to be another chapter in the systemic and pervasive disregard for clean sport by Russia." As the months passed by, and American figure skaters still had not received their medals in the sport due to the continued consideration of Valieva's case, Hirshland described the situation as "outrageous." Two years later, in January 2024, after Valieva kept more than a dozen other athletes from receiving their medals, she was banned from competition for four years by an arbitration panel at the Court of Arbitration for Sport--retroactive to the date she gave the sample, December 25, 2021--and therefore had to forfeit her medals earned during that period. Hirshland said that the decision was a “significant win not only for Team USA athletes, but also for athletes worldwide who practice fair play and advocate for clean sport.” The Russian Olympic Committee responded by writing: "war has been declared on Russian sports."

In March 2022, after the International Paralympic Committee decided to allow Russian and Belarusian athletes to compete in the Paralympic Winter Games Beijing 2022, Hirshland wrote: "we are disappointed in this outcome as it excuses Russia’s disregard for not only the Olympic Truce, but also for the victims of a senseless war."

In May 2022, Russia placed Hirshland on its list of American citizens permanently banned from entering the country, along with among others many U.S. senators and representatives from both the Democratic and Republican parties.

On January 4, 2024, Hirshland wrote a letter in support of three Russian Olympic fencers who had defected to the United States because of their opposition to Russia's invasion of Ukraine, Konstantin Lokhanov, Sergey Bida, and Violetta Bida, being granted U.S. citizenship, saying: "Our intention in endorsing their cause is to enable them to proudly represent our remarkable nation in the upcoming 2024 Olympic Games and other forthcoming international competitions." Sergey Bida expressed surprise about receiving the letter of support from the USOPC, saying: "This kind of letter, it’s impossible in Russia."

== Personal life ==
McDougall married Keith Hirshland, a sports producer for ESPN and the Golf Channel who has written three books and is the father of three adult children from former marriages. They have lived in Peapack, New Jersey, and subsequent to her becoming the CEO of the US Olympic Committee in Colorado Springs, Colorado.
