= Nell Merlino =

- Occupation: Social Entrepreneur
- Known for: Activist, Speaker, Author
- Spouse: Gary Conger
- Children: Laura Conger, Nick Conger

Nell Merlino is the founding Chairwoman of the PBB (Personal BlackBox)Trust. As the Trust Chair, Nell is leading a movement to champion personal data independence and set new standards of control, value and privacy for emerging human data rights. She has also mobilized more than 20 million people to champion women's empowerment. Nell created Take Our Daughters to Work Day, founded Count Me In for Women's Economic Independence and launched Make Mine a Million $ Business. She is the author of Stepping Out of Line: Lessons for Women Who Want it Their Way in Life, in Love, and at Work, a book for women to speak up in their work and life to get ahead.

== Personal life ==
Nell Merlino married artist Gary Conger after meeting on a blind date in a Union Square café. Nell Merlino is the daughter of the late New Jersey State Senator, Joseph P. Merlino and Molly Merlino.

== Career ==
Merlino began her career in the laborer movement, organizing women in unions such as the Amalgamated Clothing Textile Union and the 1199 National Union of Hospital and Health Care Employees. Her passion for working with women was sparked as Merlino witnessed the founding of the Coalition of Labor Union Women. Nell Merlino continued her work in women empowerment when she was named a Fulbright Scholar in 1976, where she studied the role of women in the British National Healthcare System.
Merlino worked for two state governments, in New Jersey for the Department of Human Services and in New York for the State University Hospital in Brooklyn. Merlino has spearheaded a number of campaigns to promote women's advancement in the workplace through Strategy Communication Action, Ltd. (SCA). She has worked to empower women entrepreneurs, especially veterans, through her books and partnering with organizations such as the United Nations and YMCA. Nell Merlino was a member of the Women Business Owners Advisory Board at Walmart.

=== Strategy Communication Action, Ltd. ===
Nell Merlino is founder and President of Strategy Communication Action, Ltd. (SCA) in New York City, a firm specializing in the creation of public education campaigns that motivate people to act, including Take Our Daughters to Work Day, Earth Day, .

=== Campaigns ===
The campaigns designed by Nell Merlino through SCA are the following:

Year	Campaign
1993	Organized Take Our Daughters to Work Day
1995	Launched YWCA - Week Without Violence, Served as Communication Director for the United Nations’ Fourth World Conference on Women in Beijing
2000	Founded Count Me In for Women’s Economic Independence
2005	Launched Count Me In’s Make Mine a Million $ Business Pitch Competition
2009	Authored Stepping Out of Line: Lessons for Women Who Want it Their Way in Life, in Love, and at Work

=== Advocacy ===
Merlino created Take Our Daughters to Work Day, which moved more than 25 million Americans to participate in a day dedicated to giving girls the opportunity to dream bigger about their future. She was inspired by her own experience going to work with her father. Through that initiative, Nell Merlino saw a need for an organization that directly helped women entrepreneurs grow their business, which is why she created Count Me In for Women’s Economic Independence. Founded in 1999, Count Me In was the first online micro-lender for women business owners. Today, Count Me In is fueling a mindset of success and a movement that changes the landscape of small business and how women entrepreneurs impact the national economy, benefiting all Americans and their families. Nell Merlino’s organization has directly impacted over 50,000 women to grow their businesses from small businesses to million dollar enterprises.

=== Advisor ===
Internationally, Nell Merlino serves as a Judge for the Cartier Women’s Initiative Awards, which identifies and supports young women entrepreneurs globally, who are solving critical problems with their products. For Coca-Cola, Nell has designed the pilot for Coke’s 5by20 women’s empowerment program in North America. Merlino was a member of the U.S. Department of State Advisory Committee on International Economic Policy (ACIEP), and served as a Pathways Envoy by the U.S. State Department to promote women’s business growth through South and North America during Hillary Clinton’s tenure as Secretary of State. Nell also sat on the board of the American Enterprise Organization.

=== Author ===
Nell Merlino wrote Stepping Out of Line: Lessons For Women Who Want it Their Way in Life, in Love, and at Work published by Broadway Books in 2009 as a manifesto for women to stop waiting and get what they want in love, work, and the world. Dee Dee Myers, former press secretary to President Bill Clinton, and author of Why Women Should Rule the World says, "Nell’s book gives women not just a step-by-step guide to creating the life they want, but a virtual infusion of the energy and optimism they’ll need to get started!"

Nell Merlino also contributed a chapter "Cracking the Glass Ceiling and Raising the Roof" to the MIT quarterly journal publication Innovations special issue on Youth and Economic Opportunity. Merlino writes about the need for women to continue fueling the economy and their empowerment through their businesses. She argues that women must continue to grow as leaders to be role models for other women and girls to go beyond cracking the glass ceiling, and instead raising the roof to create more jobs and opportunity.

== Awards ==
- September 2, 2011 Opening Bell Ceremony – New York Stock Exchange (NYSE) Euronext
- 2013 Small Business Influencer Award – Small Business Trends and Small Biz Technology

== Notable media appearances ==
Nell Merlino has made guest appearances on The Today Show, MSNBC, CNN’s Your Bottom Line with Christine Roman, Bloomberg TV and many more.
