= Beatriz Escalona =

American comic actress (1903–1979)

Beatriz Escalona Pérez (August 20, 1903 – April 4, 1979), also known by the stage name La Chata Noloesca, was an American comic actress whose career in Spanish-language vaudeville spanned more than four decades from the 1920s through the 1950s. She is known for creating the comic persona of la peladita “La Chata,” an underdog, fast-talking character that could survive and ironically come out ahead in any situation. Escalona formed and managed several successful vaudeville companies that performed in San Antonio, Los Angeles, Miami, New York, and other cities in the United States, Cuba, and Mexico.

== Early years ==
Escalona was born in San Antonio, Texas, on Medina Street, near the depot for the Missouri Pacific Railroad. Her father died when she was young, so she was raised by her mother, who started a business serving food to train passengers. Her first encounters with the theater took place during extended stays with relatives in Monterrey, Mexico. They lived near the Teatro Independencia, which was frequented by numerous traveling companies. According to scholar Tomás Ybarra-Frausto, Escalona "sat entranced through programs of drama, melodrama, zarzuela, and revista. [She] developed such an abiding passion for the stage that when funds were not available for admission, she created small bouquets of domestic flowers from her relatives' garden, selling them in order to buy the cheapest seats in the galería."

To continue her passion for theater back in San Antonio, and to help support her widowed mother, Escalona began working part-time as an usher at the Teatro Zaragosa. When she was sixteen, she moved to a better position at the Teatro Nacional in the downtown area. One of the headlining acts was a variety company called Los Hermanos Areu, and one of the brothers, José, fell in love with Escalona and the two were married. She was invited to join the troupe, and, under the tutelage of the brothers, trained as an actress, singer, dancer, and comedienne. In 1920, at the age of eighteen, she made her stage debut at the Teatro Colón in El Paso, Texas.

== Career ==
=== Early career ===
The Areu family was of Spanish-Cuban heritage, and they were an important troupe on the Spanish-language vaudeville and zarzuela circuit in the Southwest, touring Mexico and the Southwest throughout the 1920s. By 1930 Beatriz was known as “La Chata Noloesca,” the comic underdog character she created, and she had separated from her husband and created her own vaudeville company, Atracciones Noloesca.

=== Compania Mexicana ===
In 1936, Escalona formed a new vaudeville company primarily made up of women from San Antonio, and in 1938 the Compania Mexicana began performing throughout the United States in cities where the Hispanic populations could support live theater. Escalona's idea to was to bring Mexican variety acts to Latino communities, and the company had considerable success in Tampa, Miami, and Cuba. In 1941 following well-received performances in Chicago, the troupe went to New York, where they played various theaters and worked in radio and television.
