= Beatriz Acevedo =

American entrepreneur

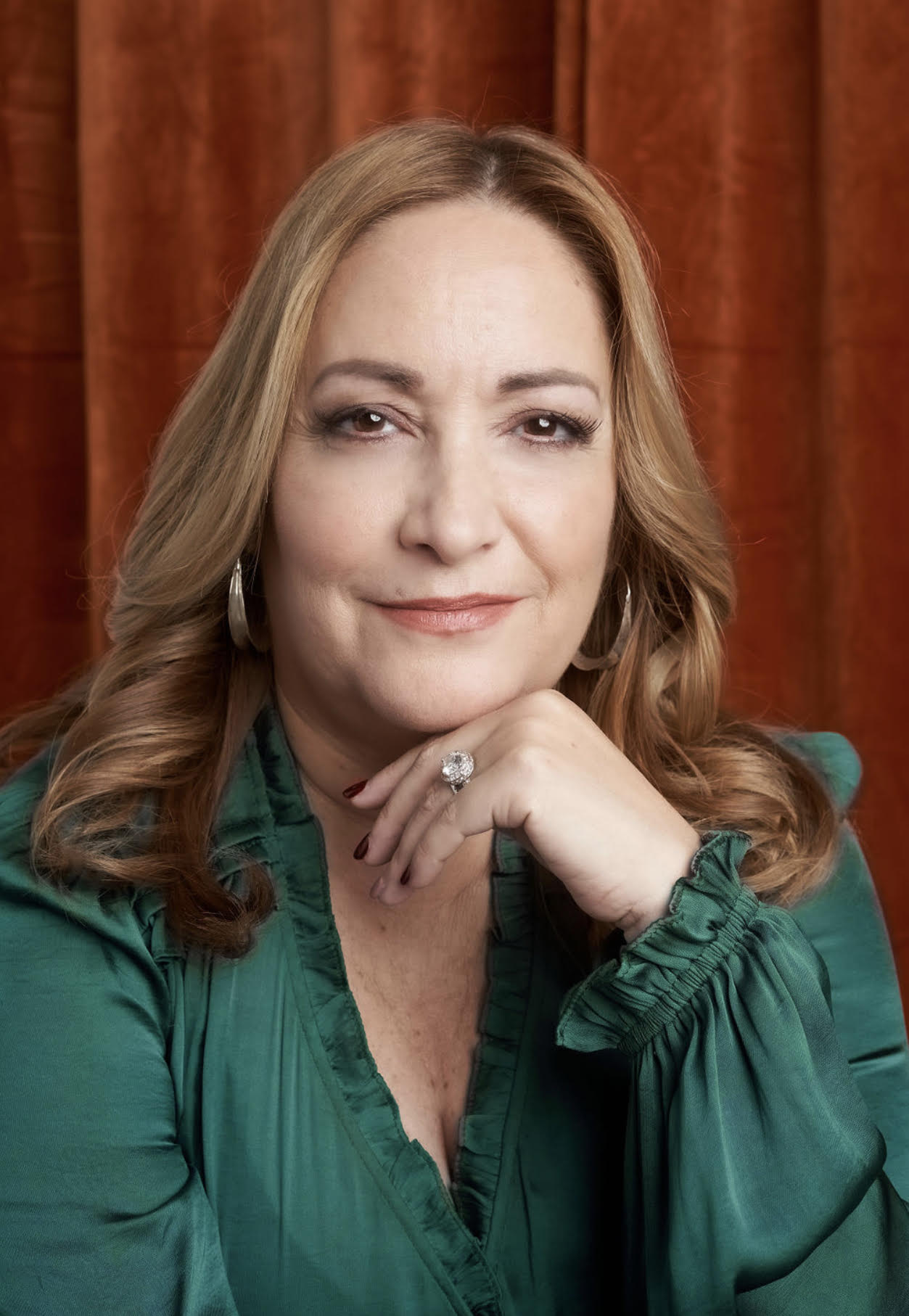
- Photograph of Beatriz Acevedo, Courtesy of https://nalanihmelo.com/
- Born: Tijuana, Baja California, Mexico
- Occupation: Entrepreneur
- Website: www.beatrizacevedo.com

Beatriz Acevedo is an American entrepreneur. She was a former radio and TV personality with three Emmy Awards, one MTV Music Award, and a Media Correspondent Award.

== Career ==
Beatriz started her career in media at the age of eight, first on radio, where she hosted a radio show for kids in Tijuana, and later on television. Her work earned her three Emmys, one MTV Music Award, and a Media Correspondent Award among others.

Beatriz later became a tech media entrepreneur as the co-founder and president of Mitú, a digital media brand for young Latinos in the U.S. Beatriz also co-founded SUMA Wealth, a financial wellness company. "She has dedicated her career to empowering and opening doors for the next generation of Latino leaders."

Currently, Beatriz is president of her family’s foundation, Acevedo Foundation. This organization "supports various arts and culture programs and provides scholarships for students who lack financial access to higher education."

== Personal life ==
Beatriz was born in Tijuana and grew up in Mexico City. Beatriz currently resides in Santa Monica, California with her husband and twin teenagers.
