= Beatriz Renta =

Argentine composer, musicologist and pedagogue

Beatriz Renta (born May 24, 1942) is an Argentine composer, musicologist, and pedagogue.

== Life and career ==
A native of Buenos Aires, Renta graduated from the Pontifical Catholic University of Argentina. She has composed a number of works for various instruments, many in chamber configurations. Renta has received a number of awards during her career; in 2015 she was honored for her body of work by the Argentine Composers' Association.
