= Beatriz Pichi Malen =

- Born: Norma Beatriz Berretta; 22 April 1953 (age 72); Los Toldos, Buenos Aires, Argentina
- Genres: Traditional Mapuche music
- Occupation: Singer
- Instrument: Vocals
- Spouse: Lucho Cruz
- Children: 1

Beatriz Pichi Malen (born 22 April 1953), the stage name of Norma Beatriz Berretta, is an Argentine singer of Mapuche origin. Her artistic work is related to the search, rescue and dissemination of the Mapuche culture. She has performed in different stages of the world singing in Mapudungun.

Her artistic career began around 1990, when she was invited by the Rockefeller Foundation to participate in the IV International Women's Congress in Manhattan.

First she was married to a Spanish Galician, and then, approximately in 1986, she remarried Quechua Lucho Cruz, with whom she had a daughter named Wychariy.

== Discography ==
- 2000 - Plata
- 2005 - Añil
- 2015 - Mapuche
- Cuatro mujeres

=== Collaborations ===
- Me mata la vida (de La Portuaria)
