= Beatrix (disambiguation) =

Beatrix is a feminine given name. It may also refer to:

- Béatrix, an 1839 novel by Honoré de Balzac
- Beatrix (restaurant), Chicago metropolitan area, Illinois, United States
- "Beatrix", a song on the 1984 album Treasure by Cocteau Twins
- Jean-Guillaume Béatrix (born 1988), French biathlete
- Beatrix Gold Mine, a South African gold mine owned by Gold Fields
- 83 Beatrix, an asteroid
