= Beatrice (given name) =

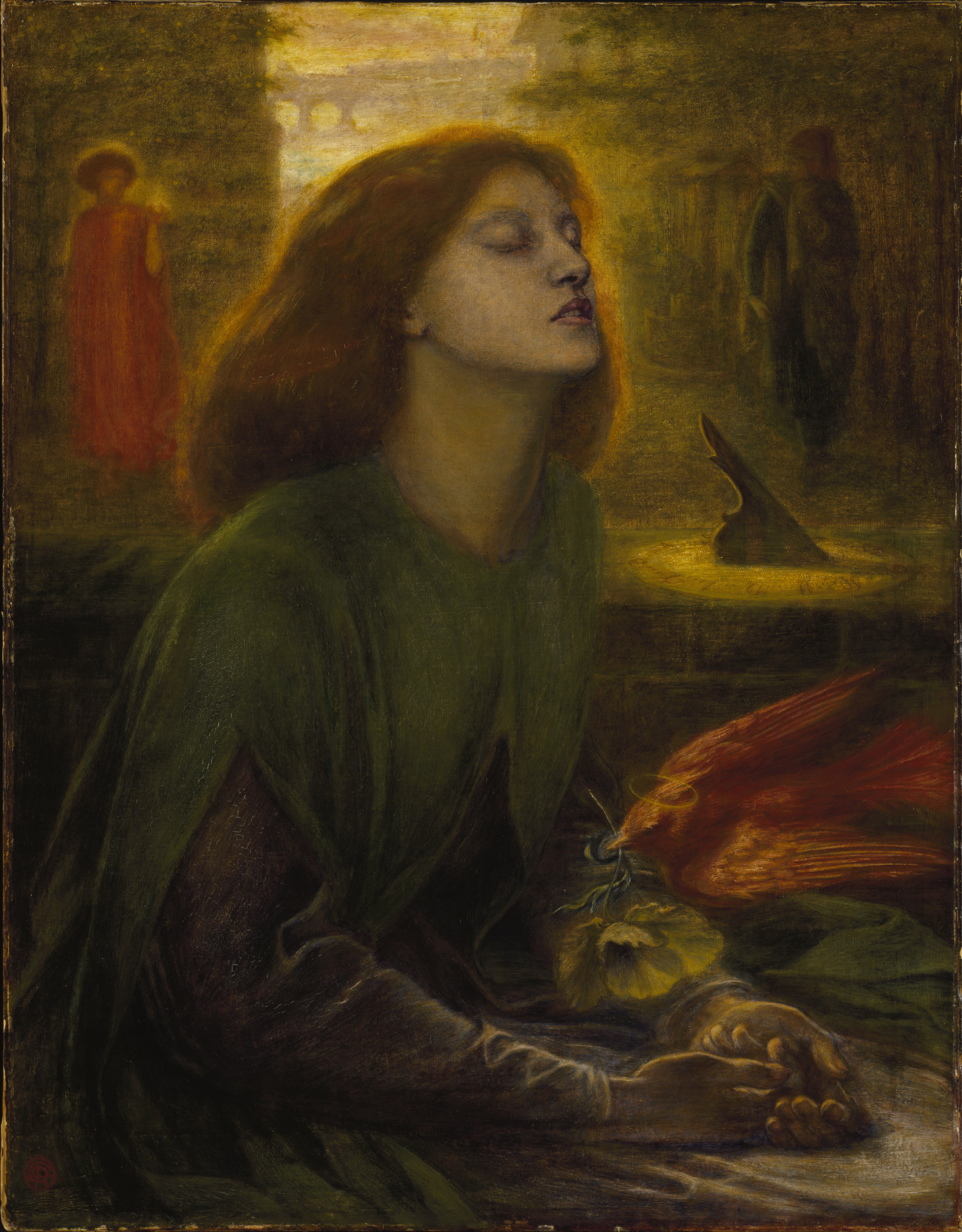
- Dante Gabriel Rossetti's depiction of Dante's Beatrice in Beata Beatrix
- Pronunciation: English: /ˈbiː(ə)trɪs/ BEE-(ə-)triss; Italian: [beaˈtriːtʃe]

Origin
- Origin: Latin
- Meaning: bringer of joy, blessings

Other names
- Short forms: Bea, Bee
- Derivative: From Latin "Beatus"
- Usage: Anglosphere
- Related names: Beatrix, Béatrice, Beatriz, Beata, Bea, Bee

Beatrice (/ˈbiː(ə)trɪs/ BEE-(ə-)triss, Italian: [beaˈtriːtʃe]) is a female given name. The English variant is derived from the French Béatrice, which came from the Latin Beatrix, which means "blessed one".

Beatrice is also the Italian language version of Beatrix. The Spanish and Portuguese form is Beatriz. The popularity of Beatrice spread because of Dante Alighieri's poetry about the Florentine woman Beatrice Portinari. Dante presents Beatrice as being worthy of speaking for God, making her a holy individual.

The name is rising in popularity in the United Kingdom. It is also gaining popularity in the United States, where it ranked as the 597th most popular name for baby girls born in 2023. In 2009, it was the 45th most common baby name for girls born in Romania.

== Name variants ==
Alternate versions of the name include

- Beata (Polish, Swedish)
- Beáta (Hungarian)
- Beate (German, Norwegian)
- Béatraís (Irish)
- Beatrica (Croatian, Slovak)
- Beatriçe (Albanian)
- Béatrice (French)
- Beatrice (Italian)
- Beatričė (Lithuanian)
- Beatrijs (Dutch)
- Beatrika (Slovene)
- Beatrice, Beatrix (Indonesian)
- Βεατρίκη (Veatriki) (Greek)
- Beatris (English)
- Beatrisa (Latvian)
- Beatrise (Latvian)
- Beatriss (English)
- Beatriu (Catalan)
- Beatrix (Latin)
- Béatrix (French)
- Beatriz (Galician, Portuguese, Spanish)
- Beatrycze (Polish)
- Beitris (Scottish Gaelic)
- Betrys (Welsh)

Short forms include

- Bea (Italian, Dutch, English, German, Galician, Spanish, Catalan)
- Béa (French)
- Beah (English)
- Beasie (English)
- Beat (English)
- Beatie (English)
- Beato (English)
- Bee (English)
- Betty (Spanish)
- Bia (Portuguese)
- Bice (Italian)
- Trix (Dutch, English)
- Trixi (English, German)
- Trixie (English)
- Trixy (English)
- Tris (English)

== Beatrice ==
=== Artists and entertainers ===
==== Actresses ====
- Beatrice Alda (born 1961), American actress and filmmaker
- Bea Arthur (1922–2009), American actress and comedian
- Mademoiselle Beatrice, stage name of Marie Beatrice Binda (1839–1878), Italian-born actress in England
- Beatrice Colen (1948–1999), American actress
- Beatrice Irwin (1877–1953) actress, poet, designer
- Bebe Neuwirth (born 1958), American actress
- Beatrice Roberts (1905–1970), American actress
- Beatrice Rosen (born 1984), French-American actress
- Mrs Patrick Campbell (1865–1940), born Beatrice Rose Stella Tanner, English actress
- Beatrice Winde (1924–2004), American actress

==== Other ====
- Beatrice Afflerbach (1920–2003), Swiss graphic designer
- Beatrice Winn Berlin (1922–1999), American painter, printmaker, teacher
- Beatrice Gjertsen Bessesen (1886–1935), American operatic soprano
- Beatrice Bligh (1916–1973), Australian gardener
- Beatritz de Dia (fl. late 12th century), Provençal poet and musician
- Beatrice Egli (born 1988), Swiss pop and Schlager singer
- Beatrice Fenton (1887–1983), American sculptor
- Beatrice Hastings, pen-name of English writer, poet and literary critic Emily Alice Haigh (1879–1943), lover of Modigliani
- Beatrice Laus (born 2000), Filipino-British singer-songwriter and guitarist
- Beatrice Partridge (1866–1963), English-born New Zealand painter
- Beatrice Rana (born 1993), Italian pianist
- Beatrice Redpath (1886–1937), Canadian poet, short story writer
- Beatrice (singer), singer in the Eurovision Song Contest 1999
- Beatrice Wood (1893–1998), American artist and studio potter

=== Athletes ===
- Beatrice Allard (born 1930), former pitcher who played in the All-American Girls Professional Baseball League during the 1949 season
- Beatrice Armstrong (1894–1981), British diver
- Béatrice Berthet, Swiss Paralympic skier
- Beatrice Blore, first woman to drive a car up the Great Orme
- Beatrice Bofia (born 1984), Cameroonian American basketball player
- Beatrice Brunnbauer (born 1992), Austrian alpine skier
- Beatrice Bürki (born 1965), Swiss diver
- Beatrice Callegari (born 1991), Italian synchronised swimmer
- Beatrice Capra (born 1992), American tennis player
- Beatrice Câșlaru (born 1975), Romanian former swimmer
- Beatrice Chebet (born 2000), Kenyan long-distance runner
- Beatrice Chepkoech (born 1991), Kenyan long-distance runner
- Beatrice Colli (born 2004), Italian speed climber
- Beatrice Dömeland (born 1973), German volleyball player
- Beatrice Domond (born 1995), regular-footed American skateboarder
- Beatrice Gärds (born 1997), Swedish footballer
- Beatrice Faumuina (born 1974), New Zealand world champion discus thrower
- Beatrice Frei, Swiss curler
- Beatrice Goad (born 1997), Australian footballer
- Beatrice Grasso (born 1995), Italian canoeist
- Béatrice Hess (born 1961), French Paralympic swimmer
- Beatrice Hill-Lowe (1869–1951), Irish archer
- Beatrice Huștiu (born 1956), Romanian competitive figure skater
- Beatrice Jepchumba (born 1983), Kenyan long-distance runner
- Beatrice Lanza (born 1982), Italian triathlete
- Beatrice Lungu (born 1956), Zambian sprinter
- Beatrice Masilingi (born 2003), Namibian sprinter
- Beatrice Merlo (born 1999), Italian professional footballer
- Beatrice Mompremier (born 1996), American basketball player
- Béatrice Mouthon (born 1966), French triathlete
- Beatrice Parrocchiale (born 1995), Italian volleyball player
- Beatrice Rigoni (born 1995), Italian rugby union player
- Beatrice Scalvedi (born 1995), Swiss alpine skier
- Beatrice Shilling (1909–1990), British aeronautical engineer, motorcycle racer and sports car racer
- Beatrice Tornatore (born 1999), Italian group rhythmic gymnast
- Beatrice Utondu (born 1969), Nigerian former sprinter
- Beatrice Vio (born 1997), better known as Bebe Vio, Italian wheelchair fencer
- Beatrice Wallin (born 1999), Swedish professional golfer

=== Politicians and public servants ===
- Beatrice Aitchison (1908–1997), Director of Transportation Research in the Bureau of Transportation of the United States Postal Service
- Beatrice Anna Lewis (suffragette) (1889–1976), British suffragette, member of the militant Women's Social and Political Union.
- Béatrice Bellamy (born 1966), French politician
- Beatrice Hall (1921–2018), American politician
- Beatrice Lorenzin (born 1971), Italian politician
- Beatrice Murdock (died 2004), American politician
- Beatrice Nkatha (1957–2024), Kenyan politician
- Beatrice Serota, Baroness Serota (1919–2002), British Government minister and a Deputy Speaker of the House of Lords
- Beatrice Trew (1897–1976), Canadian socialist politician
- Beatrice Wishart (born 1955), British politician
- Beatrice Wright (1910–2003), American-born British politician

=== Religious figures ===
- Beatrix or Beatrice (fl. 4th century), Christian martyr; see Simplicius, Faustinus and Beatrix
- Saint Beatrice d'Este (1191–1226), Italian Roman Catholic saint
- Beatrice of Silva (1424–1492), Portuguese nun and saint
- Blessed Beatrice of Nazareth (1200–1268), Flemish nun
- Blessed Beatrice of Ornacieux (ca. 1240–1306/1309), French nun and religious leader

=== Scientists, engineers and academics ===
- Beatrice Gelber, American psychologist
- Beatrix Havergal (1901–1980), English horticulturist
- Beatrice Hicks (1919–1979), American engineer
- Beatrice M. Hinkle (1874–1953), American pioneering feminist, psychoanalyst and writer
- Beatriz Ghirelli (1915–1992), Argentinian engineer, pioneer of standardisation practices.
- Beatrice Krauss (1903–1998), American botanist
- Beatrice Lindsay (1858–1917), English zoologist, writer, and editor
- Beatrice Rivière, French applied mathematician
- Beatrice Shilling (1909–1990), British aeronautical engineer and motorcyclist
- Beatrice Tinsley (1941–1981), New Zealand astronomer and cosmologist
- Beatrice Webb (1858–1943), English sociologist, economist, socialist, labour historian and social reformer

=== Aristocrats ===
- Beatrice of Albon (1161–1228), French Countess of Albon and Dauphine of Viennois
- Beatrice of England (1242–1275), daughter of Henry III of England and Eleanor of Provence
- Beatrice of Naples (fl. 1476–1500), queen of Hungary, also known as Beatrix of Aragon
- Beatrice of Portugal (disambiguation)
- Beatrice of Savoy (disambiguation)
- Princess Beatrice (disambiguation)
- Beatrice Plummer, Baroness Plummer (1903–1972), British life peer
- Beatrice Cenci (1577–1599), Italian noblewoman who, with other members of her family, murdered her rapist father
- Beatrice Borromeo (1985), Italian noblewoman and journalist
- Beatrice von Hardenberg (1947–2020), German aristocrat and magazine editor
- Princess Beatrice of Bourbon (1874–1961), Princess of Roviano, third daughter of Prince Carlos, Duke of Madrid

=== Miscellaneous ===
- Beatrice Agyeman Abbey, Ghanaian CEO of Media General
- Beatrice Allen (born 1950), vice president of the Gambia National Olympic Committee since 2009 and a member of the International Olympic Committee starting in 2006
- Beatrice Barth (1877–1966), New Zealand piano teacher
- Beatrice Beeby (1904–1991), New Zealand educator
- Béatrice Bulteau, French equine artist
- Beatrice Collenette (1899–2001), Guernsey-born American dancer and dance educator
- Beatrice Dickson (1852–1941), Swedish philanthropist and temperance activist
- Beatrice Green (1894–1927), Welsh labour activist
- Beatrice Laura Goff (1903–1998), American archaeologist and biblical scholar
- Beatrice McCartney, Paul McCartney's daughter with Heather Mills
- Beatrice Monti della Corte, Italian art and literature philanthropist, wife of Gregor von Rezzori
- Beatrice Portinari (1265–1290), great love and muse of poet Dante Alighieri
- Beatrix de Rijk (1883–1958), first Dutch woman pilot
- Beatrix de Rijke (1421–1468), Dutch foundling in Dordrecht in 1421.
- Beatrix Potter (1866–1943), author of children's books
- Beatrice Warde (1900–1969), American expert on typography

== Fictional characters ==
- Beatrice (inspired by Beatrice Portinari), the guide through Paradise in Dante's Divine Comedy
- Beatrice, in William Shakespeare's Much Ado About Nothing
- Beatrice-Joanna, in Thomas Middleton and William Rowley's The Changeling.
- Beatrice Baudelaire, in A Series of Unfortunate Events
- Beatrice Carbone, one of the cast of characters in A View from the Bridge, a play by Arthur Miller
- Beatrice, the Endless and Golden Witch in Umineko no Naku Koro ni
- Beatrice, in the manga Gunslinger Girl.
- Beatrice (Re:Zero), a character in the light novel series Re:Zero − Starting Life in Another World
- Beatrice, a bluebird in the 2014 animated television miniseries Over the Garden Wall.
- Beatrice "Aunt Bee" Taylor, a major character from the 1960s American sitcom The Andy Griffith Show

== See also ==
- "Beatrijs", a 13th-century Dutch poem about a nun with this name
- Beatrix
- Beatriz
