= Beatrix =

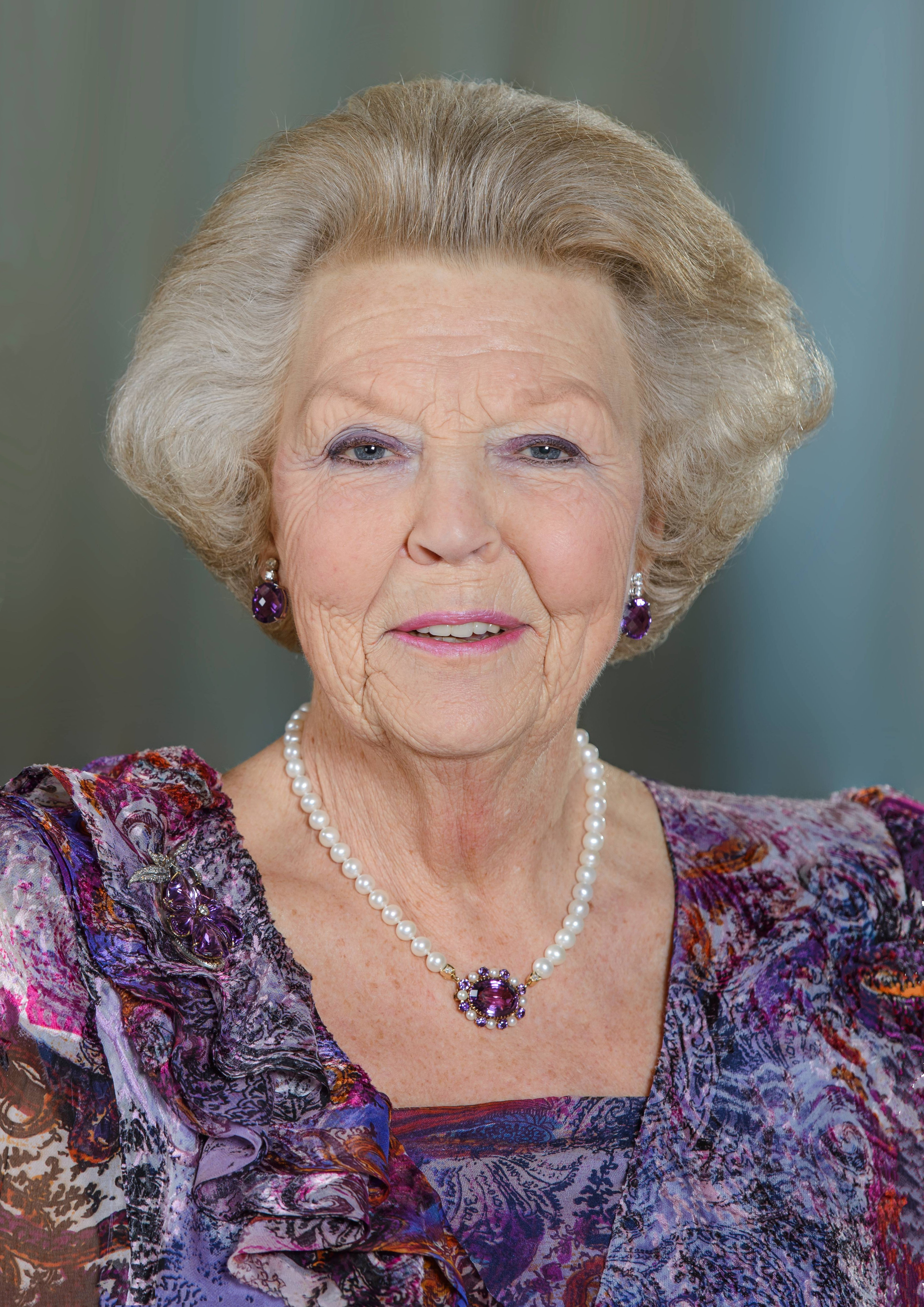
- Princess Beatrix is a Dutch princess and former queen of the Netherlands.
- Pronunciation: BEE-ə-triks
- Gender: Female

Origin
- Meaning: Voyager, Traveller

Other names
- Short form: Bea
- Nicknames: Trix, Trixie
- Related names: Bea, Beata, Beate, Beatrice, Béatrice, Beatriz

Beatrix is a Latin feminine given name, most likely derived from Viatrix, a feminine form of the Late Latin name Viator which meant "voyager, traveller" and later influenced in spelling by association with the Latin word beatus or "blessed". It is pronounced /ˈbiːətrɪks/ BEE-ə-triks in British English and the same or /ˈbiːtrɪks/ BEE-triks in North American English. Another North American English pronunciation however approximates that of most other languages: /ˈbeɪətrɪks/ BAY-ə-triks, as shown by US dictionary entries for the former queen of the Netherlands.

Common forms of this name include Beatrice in English and Italian, Béatrice in French, Beatriz in Spanish and Portuguese, Beate in German, and Beata in Polish and Swedish. Common short forms are Bea and Trixie. See Beatrice for other derivatives.

== People ==
=== Saints ===
- Saint Beatrix (died c. 303), Christian martyr, in older sources named Viatrix ("the traveler").
- Saint Beatrix d'Este (1226?–1262), Italian Benedictine nun
- Blessed Beatrix or Beatrix of Nazareth (1200–1268), Flemish Cistercian nun, mystic and author
- Beatrix d'Ornacieux (c. 1240 – c. 1306/9), French Carthusian nun
- Beatrix da Silva (1424–1492), Portuguese Franciscan nun

=== Royalty and nobility ===
- Beatrix de Courtenay (died 1245), Countess of Edessa
- Beatrix de Vesci, (died c. 1125), Anglo-Norman noble
- Beatrix of Andechs-Merania (1210–1271), German noble
- Beatrix of Aragon (1457–1508), Queen consort of Hungary and Bohemia
- Beatrix of Baden (1492–1535), Margravine of Baden
- Beatrix of Bar (c. 1017 – 1076), marchioness of Tuscany
- Beatrix of Bavaria (1344–1359), Queen consort of Sweden
- Beatrix of Brandenburg (died 1314), wife of Henry II, Lord of Mecklenburg
- Beatrix of Falkenburg (1254–1277), queen consort of the Romans
- Beatrix of Franconia (1037–1061), German Abbess and daughter of Holy Roman Emperor Henry III
- Beatrix of Luxembourg (1305–1319), Queen consort of Hungary
- Beatrix of Nuremberg (c. 1362 – 1414), Duchess of Austria
- Beatrix of Silesia (1290–1322), queen consort of the Romans
- Beatrix of Swabia (1198–1212), Holy Roman Empress
- Beatrix of the Netherlands (born 1938), queen regnant from 1980 to 2013
- Beatrix, Countess of Schönburg-Glauchau (1930–2021), Countess consort of Schönburg-Glauchau
- Princess Beatrix of Hohenlohe-Langenburg (1936–1997), daughter of Gottfried, Prince of Hohenlohe-Langenburg
- Queen Beatrix (disambiguation)
- Princess Beatrix (disambiguation)

=== Others ===
- Beatrix Balogh (born 1974), Hungarian handball player
- Beatrix Beauclerk, Duchess of St Albans (1877–1953), English peer
- Béatrix Beck (1914–2008), French writer
- Beatrix Borchard (born 1950), German musicologist and author
- Beatrix Boulsevicz (born 1987), Hungarian swimmer
- Beatrix Campbell (born 1947), British journalist and author
- Béatrix de Choiseul-Stainville (1729–1794), French salonnière and bibliophile
- Beatrix Christian, Australian playwright and screenwriter
- Béatrix de Cusance (1614–1663), Duchess of Lorraine
- Beatrix Dobie (1887–1945), New Zealand landscape artist
- Beatrix D'Souza (born 1935), Indian politician and social worker
- Béatrix Dussane (1888–1969), French stage actress
- Beatrix Farrand (1872–1959), American landscape gardener and landscape architect
- Beatrix Galindo (c. 1465 – 1534), Spanish physician and educator
- Beatrix Hamburg (1923–2018), American psychiatrist
- Beatrix Havergal (1901–1980), English horticulturist
- Beatrix von Holte (1250–1327), German abbess
- Beatrix Hoyt (1880–1963), American golfing champion
- Beatrix Jones Farrand (1872–1959), American landscape architect
- Beatrix Kisházi (born 1946), Hungarian table tennis player
- Beatrix Kökény (born 1969), Hungarian handball player
- Béatrix La Palme (1878–1921), Canadian soprano and violinist
- Beatrix Lambton, Countess of Durham (1859–1937), British peer
- Beatrix Lehmann (1903–1979), British actress, theatre director and author
- Beatrix Leslie (c. 1577 – 1661), Scottish midwife executed for witchcraft
- Beatrix Loughran (1900–1975), American figure skater
- Beatrix Lyall (1873–1948), British social reformer and politician
- Beatrix Mahlknecht, Italian luger
- Beatrix Waring McCay (1901–1972), Australian barrister
- Béatrix Midant-Reynes, French Egyptologist
- Beatrix Miller (1923–2014), British editor of Queen and Vogue magazines
- Beatrix Müllner (born 1970), Austrian synchronized swimmer
- Beatrix Nobis (1950–2024), German art historian
- Beatrix Ong (born 1976), British luxury goods designer
- Beatrix Maud Palmer (1858–1950), British political and women's rights activist
- Beatrix Pesek, Hungarian ten-pin bowler
- Beatrix Potter (1866–1943), English illustrator, author and conservationist
- Beatrix Rechner (born 1951), Swiss high jumper
- Beatrix de Rijk (1883–1958), Dutch aviator
- Beatrix de Rijke (1421–1468), Dutch foundling
- Beatrix Ruf (born 1960), German art curator
- Beatrix Schröer (born 1963), German rower
- Beatrix Schuba (born 1951), Austrian figure skater
- Beatrix Sherman (1894–1975), American silhouette artist
- Beatrix von Storch (born 1971), German politician
- Beatrix Lucia Catherine Tollemache (1840–1926), British poet and translator
- Beatrix Tóth (born 1967), Hungarian handball player

== Fictional characters ==
- Beatrix Amerhauser, in the manga series Zom 100: Bucket List of the Dead
- Trixie Belden, title character in a series of 'girl detective' mysteries
- Beatrix Cenci, protagonist of an opera based on the Italian noblewoman Beatrice Cenci (1577–1599)
- Beatrix "Trixie" Franklin, nurse and midwife from Call the Midwife
- Beatrix Kiddo, the protagonist of the Kill Bill films
- Beatrix MacMillan, a Doctor Who companion
- Béatrix de Rochefide, the protagonist of Balzac's novel Béatrix
- Beatrix Vespasian-Orus, in the Ninjago animated television series
- General Beatrix, a character in the video game Final Fantasy IX
- Beatrix, mother of the Knight of the Swan in the medieval tale of the same name
- Beatrix, one of the main characters in the Netflix series Fate: The Winx Saga
- Beatrix, a playable character in the video game Mobile Legends: Bang Bang

== See also ==
- Beat (name)
- Beatrice (given name)
- Beatus (disambiguation)
