= Infanta Beatriz =

Infanta Beatriz may refer to:

== Portugal ==
- Beatrice of Portugal, Countess of Alburquerque (c.1354–1381)
- Beatrice of Portugal (1373–c.1420), Queen consort of Castile and León, and Queen regnant of Portugal (disputed)
- Beatrice, Countess of Arundel (c.1380–1439)
- Beatriz of Portugal, Duchess of Viseu (1430–1506)
- Beatrice of Coimbra (1435–1462)
- Beatrice of Portugal, Duchess of Savoy (1504–1538)

== Castile ==
- Beatrice of Castile (1242–1303), Queen of Portugal
- Beatrice of Castile, Marchioness of Montferrat (1254–1286)
- Beatrice of Castile (1293–1359), Queen of Portugal

== Navarre ==
- Beatrice of Navarre, Duchess of Burgundy (1242–1295)
- Beatrice of Navarre, Countess of La Marche (1386–1410)

== Spain ==
- Princess Beatrice of Saxe-Coburg and Gotha (1884–1966)
- Infanta Beatriz of Spain (1909–2002)

== See also ==
- Beatriz
- Beatrice (given name)
- Beatrice of Portugal (disambiguation)
- Beatrice of Castile (disambiguation)
- Beatrice of Navarre (disambiguation)
