= Bee (given name) =

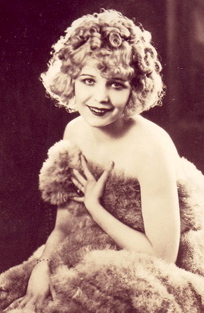
- Bee Palmer

Origin
- Languages: Latin, English

Other names
- Derivatives: Beatrix, Beatrice, Beatriz
- Usage: Usually a nickname
- Related names: Beatrix, Beatrice, Beata, Béatrice, Beate, Bea, Beatriz, Beat

Bee is a given name and a nickname, usually of Beatrice, Beatrix or Beatriz. Notable people include:

- Bee Jackson (1903–1933), American actress and dancer
- Bee Ho Gray (1885–1951), performer in Wild West shows, vaudeville, circus, silent films and radio
- Bee Nguyen (born 1981), member of the Georgia House of Representatives
- Bee Palmer (1894–1967), American singer and dancer
- Bee Vang (born 1991), actor
- Bee Wilson (born 1974), British food writer and historian

== See also ==
- Bee (surname)
- Beatrice (given name)
- Beatriz
- Beatrix
- Bea (given name)
