= Bea (given name) =

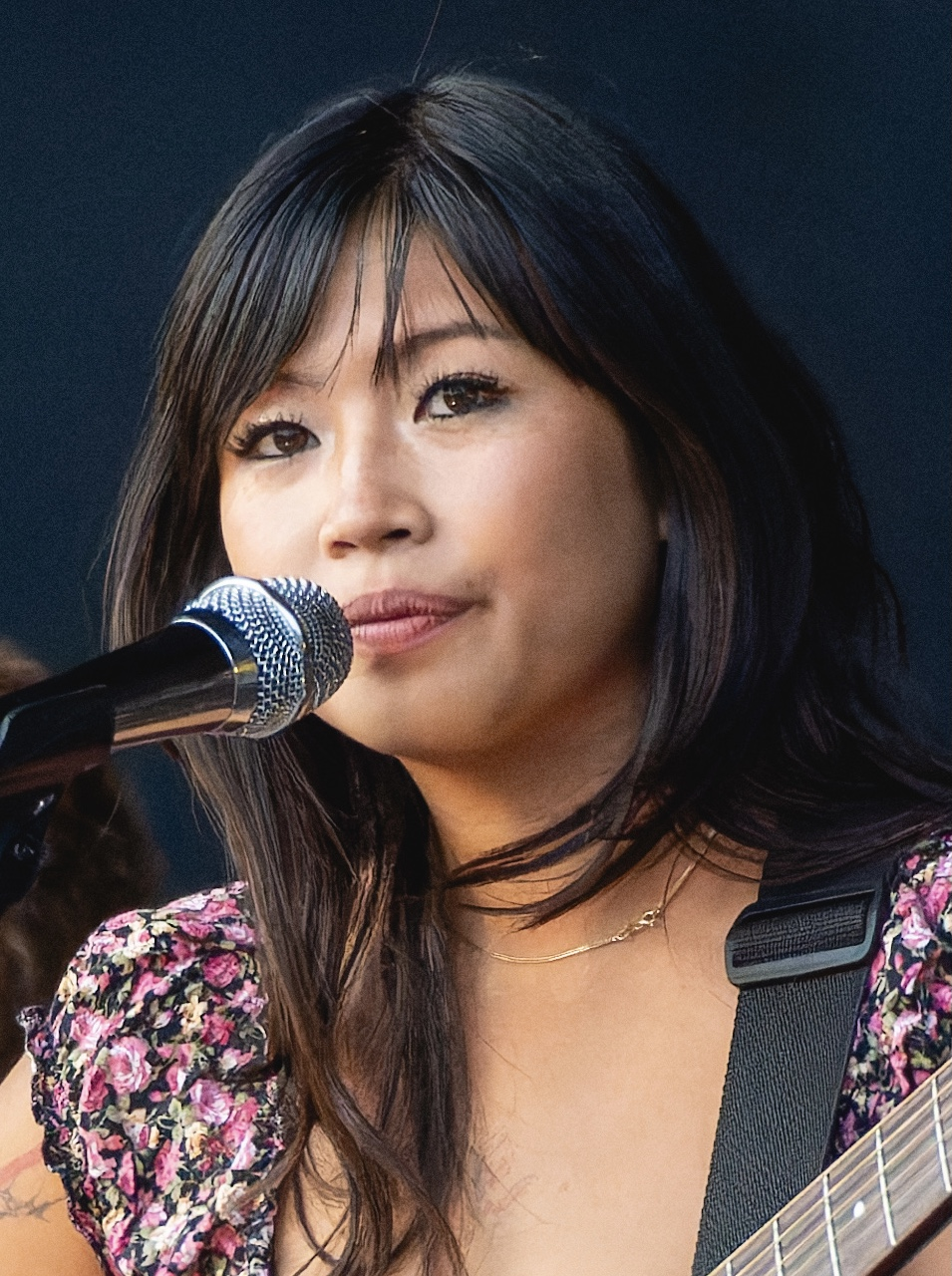
- Beabadoobee
- Pronunciation: Bee
- Gender: Female

Other names
- Derivatives: Beatrix, Beatrice, Beatriz
- Usage: Usually a nickname
- Related names: Beatrix, Beatrice, Beata, Béatrice, Beate, Beatriz, Bee

Bea is a feminine given name, often short for Beatrice, Beatrix or Beatriz. Notable people with the name include:

- Bea Alonzo (born 1987), Filipina actress and singer
- Bea Arthur (1922–2009), American actress
- Bea Ballard (born 1959), British television producer
- Bea Barrett (1916–2002), American amateur golfer
- Beabadoobee (born 2000), Filipino-British singer
- Bea Benaderet (1906–1968), American actress
- Bea Bielik (born 1980), American tennis player
- Bea Binene (born 1997), Filipina actress and singer
- Bea Booze (1912–1986), American R&B and jazz singer
- Bea Chester (born c. 1921), American baseball player
- Bea Feitler (1938–1982), Brazilian-born art director
- Bea Firth (1946–2008), Canadian politician
- Bea Gaddy (1933–2001), American humanitarian
- Beatrice "Bea" Gomez (born 1995), Filipina beauty queen and model
- Béa Gonzalez (born 1962), Spanish-Canadian novelist
- Bea Gorton (1946–2020), American college basketball coach
- Gertrude Himmelfarb (1922–2019), also known as Bea Kristol, American historian
- Beatrice Lillie (1894–1989), Canadian actress
- Bea Lindhorst (born 1985), German politician
- Bea Maddock (1934–2016), Australian artist
- Bea Mettler (born 1978), Swiss footballer
- Bea Miles (1902–1973), Australian eccentric
- Bea Miller (born 1999), American singer
- Bea Nettles (born 1946), art photographer and author
- Bea Nicolas (born 1994), Filipina actress
- Bea Palya (born 1976), Hungarian folk singer
- Bea Santiago (born 1990), Filipina actress and beauty queen of Miss Earth 2017
- Bea Saw (born 1985), Filipina actress
- Marie Beatrice Schol-Schwarz (1898–1969), also known as Bea Schwartz, Dutch phytopathologist
- Bea Segura (born 1975), Spanish actress
- Bea Wain (1917–2017), American singer
- Bea Millan-Windorski (born 2002), Filipina-American beauty pageant titleholder
- Bea Wyler (born 1951), Swiss-German rabbi

== Fictional characters ==
- Bea (Dennis the Menace), in the British comic strip Dennis the Menace

== See also ==
- Beatrice (disambiguation)
