= Béatrice =

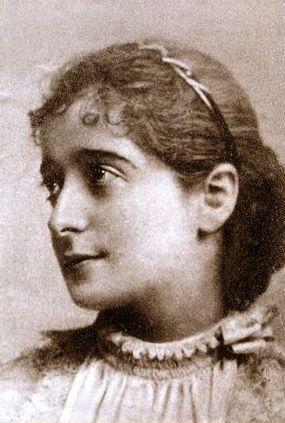
- Béatrice Ephrussi de Rothschild
- Gender: Female
- Language: French

Origin
- Language: Latin
- Meaning: Blessed one

Other names
- Short forms: Bea, Bee
- Nickname: Bebe
- Anglicisation: Beatrice
- Derivative: From Latin "beatus"
- Usage: France
- Related names: Beatrix, Beatrice, Beata, Beatriz, Beate, Bea, Bee

Béatrice is a French feminine given name. Notable people with the name include:

- Béatrice Bonifassi (born c. 1971), French-born vocalist
- Béatrice Dalle (born 1964), French actress
- Béatrice de Camondo (1894–1944), French socialite and a Holocaust victim
- Béatrice de Planisoles, minor noble in the Comté de Foix in the late thirteenth and early fourteenth century
- Béatrice Descamps (born 1951), French politician and a member of the Senate of France
- Béatrice Ephrussi de Rothschild (1864–1934), French socialite
- Béatrice Farinacci, former French figure skater
- Béatrice Gosselin (born 1958), French politician
- Béatrice Hess (born 1961 or 1962), French swimmer
- Béatrice Hiéronyme de Lorraine (1662–1738), member of the House of Lorraine
- Béatrice Knopf-Basson (born 1958), French sprint canoer
- Béatrice Lalinon Gbado, children's writer
- Béatrice Longuenesse, professor of philosophy at New York University
- Béatrice Martin, (born 1989), French-Canadian singer
- Béatrice Mouthon (born 1966), French athlete who competes in triathlon
- Béatrice Nirere, Rwandan politician who was convicted of genocide for her involvement in the 1994 Rwandan Genocide
- Béatrice of Albon (1161–1228), countess and dauphine in 1162 upon the death of her father Guigues V
- Princess Béatrice of Bourbon-Two Sicilies (born 1950), French Royal
- Béatrice of Vermandois (c. 880–931), daughter of Herbert I, Count of Vermandois
- Béatrice Patrie (born 1957), French politician and Member of the European Parliament
- Béatrice Pavy (born 1958), member of the National Assembly of France
- Béatrice Picard (1929–2025), Canadian actress
- Béatrice Poulot (fl. c. 2000), French singer
- Béatrice Romand (born 1952), French actress best known for her work with director Éric Rohmer
- Béatrice Schönberg (born 1953), French television journalist
- Béatrice Stöckli (died 2020), Swiss Christian missionary
- Béatrice Tillier (born 1972), French illustrator and comics cartoonist
- Béatrice Vernaudon (born 1953), French politician

== See also ==
- Beatrice (given name)
- Béatrice et Bénédict, an opera in two acts by Hector Berlioz
- Béatrice, an opera in four acts by André Messager
