= Saint Beatrice =

Saint Beatrice may refer to:

- Beatrice or Beatrix, 4th-century martyr - see Simplicius, Faustinus and Beatrix
- Saint Beatrice d'Este (1191–1226), Italian Roman Catholic saint
- Beatrice of Silva (1424–1492), Portuguese nun

== See also ==
- Blessed Beatrice of Nazareth (1200-1268), Flemish nun
- Blessed Beatrice of Ornacieux (ca. 1240–1306/1309), French nun
