= Beat (name) =

- Pronunciation: Beh-awe-t
- Gender: Male

Other gender
- Feminine: Beata, Beate

Origin
- Language: Latin
- Meaning: Blessed

Other names
- Derivative: From Latin "Beatus"
- Usage: Switzerland, Germany

Beat (pronounced "Bey-ah-t") is a German male given name, derived from the Latin name Beatus, which means "blessed". The name is common in German-speaking Switzerland because of St Beatus of Lungern, considered a patron saint. The female variant is Beate. The name Beat may refer to:

- Beat Jans (born 1964), Swiss politician who serves as a Member of the Swiss Federal Council since 2024
- Beat Bosch (born 1971), Swiss athlete
- Beat Breu (born 1957), Swiss cyclist
- Beat Fehr (1943–1967), Swiss racing driver
- Beat Feuz (born 1987), Swiss alpine skier
- Beat Forster (born 1983), Swiss ice hockey player
- Beat Furrer (born 1954), Austrian composer
- Beat Gähwiler (decathlete) (born 1965), Swiss athlete
- Beat Gerber (born 1982), Swiss ice hockey player
- Beat Grögli (born 1970), Swiss Roman Catholic Bishop of Sankt Gallen
- Beat Hefti (born 1978), Swiss bobsledder
- Beat W. Hess (born 1949), Swiss businessman
- Beat Koch (born 1972), Swiss cross country skier
- Beat Mändli (born 1969), Swiss equestrian
- Beat Müller (born 1978), Swiss sport shooter
- Beat Raaflaub (born 1946), Swiss conductor
- Beat Richner (1947–2018), Swiss doctor
- Beat Rüedi (1920–2009), Swiss ice hockey player
- Beat Schwerzmann (born 1966), Swiss rower
- Beat Seitz (born 1973), Swiss bobsledder
- Beat Streuli (born 1957), Swiss artist
- Beat Sutter (born 1962), Swiss football player
- Beat Wyss (born 1947), Swiss art historian
- Beat Zberg (born 1971), Swiss cyclist
- Beat/Doctor Beat, a fictional character in the Gloria Estefan song Dr. Beat

== See also ==
- Beate
- Beatus
