= Trixie =

Trixie is a feminine given name, often a shortened form of the given names Beatrix or Beatrice or Patricia or adopted as a nickname or used as a given name.

Trixie may refer to:

== People ==
- Trixie Friganza (1870–1955), American vaudeville performer and stage and silent film actress
- Trixie Gardner, Baroness Gardner of Parkes (born 1927), Australian-born British politician, dentist and peeress
- Trixie Maristela (born 1985), Filipino transgender actress
- Trixie Mattel (born 1989), American drag queen and winner of RuPaul's Drag Race All Stars season 3
- Trixie Minx (born 1981), American burlesque dancer
- Trixi Schuba (born 1951), Austrian figure skater
- Trixie Smith (1895–1943), African American blues singer, vaudeville entertainer and actress
- Trixie Tagg, Australian soccer player and coach
- Trixie Whitley (born 1987), Belgian American multi-instrumentalist

=== Trixi variant ===
- Trixi Schuba (born 1951), Austrian former competitive figure skater
- Beatrix 'Trixi' Pospíšilová Čelková (1925-1997), Slovak World War II era spy and antifascist resistance member
- Trixi Worrack (born 1981), German former professional road racing cyclist

== Fictional characters ==
- Thelma Norton, a character in the series The Honeymooners, is nicknamed Trixie
- Trixie, a character in the series Speed Racer
- Trixie, a character in the series Deadwood
- Trixie, a character in the series LazyTown
- Trixie, a triceratops toy in the film Toy Story 3
- Trixie Belden, the title character of a series of mysteries
- Trixie Lorraine, a character in the movie Gold Diggers of 1933 portrayed by Aline MacMahon
- Trixie Sting, a character in Slugterra
- Trixie Tang, a character in the series The Fairly OddParents
- Trixie Lulamoon, a character in the series My Little Pony: Friendship Is Magic
- Trixie Carter, a character in the series American Dragon: Jake Long
- Trixie Tucker, a character in the Australian television soap opera Neighbours
- Trixie Franklin, a character in Call the Midwife played by Helen George
- Trixie, a female cat in Top Cat: The Movie
- Trixie, the infant daughter in the comic strip Hi and Lois
- Beatrice "Trixie" Espinoza, a character in the American television series, Lucifer.
- Aunt Trixie, a character in the Australian TV series Bluey
- Beatricia "Trixie" Triquella the fox.

== Film ==
- Trixie (film), a 2000 American mystery-crime film
- Trixie Film, producer of the Burn to Shine DVD series
- A fictional virus in the 1973 film The Crazies and its 2010 remake, alternatively titled Code Name: Trixie
- A working title of Star Wars: The Rise of Skywalker
- Trixie Mattel: Moving Parts, a documentary showcasing what happened backstage during Trixie Mattel's Moving Parts tour

== Other uses ==
- Trixie (bet), a type of wager
- Trixie (slang), a pejorative
- Cyclone Trixie (1975), an Australian storm
- Trixie, codename for Debian 13, released in August 2025
- Trixie, a typeface created by Dutch designer Erik van Blokland in 1991
