= Beata (Lenape prophet) =

Lenape prophet

Beata (1769–unknown) (also known as Beade and Beate) was a Lenape woman who was instrumental in the revival and adaptation of Indigenous religious and cultural practices among the Lenape (Delaware) and other native groups in what is today central Indiana. Her visions and other abilities became famous and known throughout the region, drawing demand for her services from other Indigenous groups and suspicion from Euro-American settlers and US Government authorities.

== Early life ==
Few details are known about Beata's early life. She was likely born in the Moravian mission community of Friedenshütten, Pennsylvania, near the town of Wyalusing on the Susquehanna River. Beata was likely the daughter of Moses and Juliana. As a young child or infant Beata was gravely ill. This likely explains her name, as Beata (meaning Blessed) was a name applied by Moravians to children who died in infancy. At some point her family left the mission community, relocating to the newly established Lenape towns along the White River, east of present-day Indianapolis.

== Visions ==
In February 1805, Beata received her first vision. In it, two spirits appear to her. They chastised the Lenape for the introduction of new religious practices. The spirits instructed Beata to encourage people "to live again as in olden times, and love one another sincerely." The vision ends with the two spirits arguing over the nature of a messenger who will appear as a sign to reiterate the message.

A second vision, in January 1806, entailed God appearing to Beata and giving her a "small white thing" to swallow. Upon ingesting the "thing" Beata was only able to speak "the Word of God."

== Influence and impact ==
Beata's influence and reputation spread beyond her Lenape community. During the late winter and spring of 1805 Beata's teachings inspired a large gathering in Woapicamikunk, near present-day Muncie. In September 1805, Wyandot leaders requested her presence to assist with investigating a series of suspected poisonings. Lenape leaders, particularly Buckonghales, were reluctant to part with Beata's power at the time. Beata was instrumental in seeking out witches and "poison-masters" among the Lenape community. Her authority continued to grow until the spring of 1806 when the Tenskwatawa, or "Shawnee prophet" took over leadership of the investigation into witchcraft.
