= Empress Beatrice =

Empress Beatrice or Empress Beatrix may refer to:

- Beatrice I, Countess of Burgundy (1143–1184), wife of Frederick Barbarossa, Holy Roman Emperor
- Beatrice of Swabia (1198–1212), wife of Otto IV, Holy Roman Emperor
- Beatrice of Sicily, Latin Empress (c. 1252–1275), wife of Philip of Courtenay, Latin Emperor

== See also ==
- Queen Beatrice (disambiguation)
