= Bee (surname) =

Bee is a surname.

Those bearing it include the following:

- Andrew Bee (soldier) (fl. 1860s), American soldier
- Barnard E. Bee Sr. (1787–1853), Texas politician
- Barnard Elliott Bee Jr., (1824–1861), American soldier
- Carlos Bee (1867–1932), American politician
- Clair Bee (1896–1983), American basketball coach
- Ephraim Bee (1802–1888), American politician
- Frederick Bee (1825–1892), American pioneer & lawyer
- Guy Bee (fl. 2000s), American director & producer
- Hamilton P. Bee (1822–1897), American soldier & politician
- Helen Bee (born 1939), American psychologist
- Jaymz Bee (born 1963), Canadian musician
- Kenny Bee (born 1953), Hong Kong musician & actor
- Marinus Bee (born 1971), Surinamese politician and sports manager
- Molly Bee (1939–2009), American singer
- Ryan Bee (born 1995), American football player
- Samantha Bee (born 1969), Canadian performer
- Thomas Bee (1739–1812), American farmer & jurist
- Thomas Walker Bee (1822–1910), South Australian public servant
- Tim Bee (fl. 2000s), American politician
- Tom Bee (fl. from 1970s), American musician & entrepreneur

== See also ==
- Bee (given name)
