= Queen Beatrice =

Queen Beatrix (born 1938) was the Queen of Netherlands from 1980 until her abdication in 2013.

Queen Beatrice or Queen Beatrix may also refer to:

- Beatrix of Bavaria (died 1359), Queen consort of Eric XII of Sweden
- Beatrice of Bourbon, Queen of Bohemia, (1320–1383), Queen consort of Bohemia by marriage to John of Bohemia
- Beatrice I, Countess of Burgundy (1143–1184), Holy Roman Empress and Queen consort of Frederick Barbarossa
- Beatrice of Castile (1242–1303), second Queen consort of Afonso III of Portugal
- Beatrice of Castile (1293–1359), Queen consort of Afonso IV of Portugal
- Beatrice d'Este, Queen of Hungary (1215 – before 1245), Queen consort of Hungary as the third wife of King Andrew II of Hungary
- Beatrice of Luxembourg (1305–1319), Queen consort of Charles I of Hungary
- Beatrice of Naples (1457–1508), also known as Beatrice of Aragon, twice Queen consort of Hungary and of Bohemia, having married both Matthias Corvinus and Vladislaus II
- Beatrice of Portugal (1373 – c. 1420), Queen consort of John I of Castile
- Beatrice of Provence (c. 1229 – 1267), ruling Countess of Provence and Forcalquier from 1245 until her death, and Countess of Anjou and Maine, Queen consort of Sicily and Naples by marriage to Charles I of Naples
- Beatrice of Rethel (c. 1132 – 1185), third Queen consort of the King Roger II of Sicily
- Beatrice of Silesia (1290–1332), Holy Roman Empress and German Queen as the first wife of Louis IV
- Beatrice of Swabia (1198–1212), Holy Roman Empress and German Queen as the first wife of Otto IV
- Elisabeth of Swabia (1205–1235), renamed Beatrice, Queen consort of Castile and León by marriage to Ferdinand III of Castile
- Beatrice of Vermandois, (880–931) Queen consort of Robert I of France

== See also ==
- Beatrice (given name)
- Beatrix
- Empress Beatrice (disambiguation)
