= World Junior Alpine Skiing Championships 2016 =

International skiing competition

The World Junior Alpine Skiing Championships 2016 were the 35th World Junior Alpine Skiing Championships, held between 25 February and 5 March 2016 in Sochi, Russia.

== Medal winners ==
=== Men's events ===
Event	Gold		Silver		Bronze	
Downhill	Erik Arvidsson; United States	1:11.66	Stefan Babinsky; Austria	1:11.86	Victor Schuller; France	1:12.01
Super-G	Matthieu Bailet; France	1:09.95	James Crawford; Canada	1:10.32	Marco Odermatt; Switzerland	1:10.48
Giant Slalom	Marco Odermatt; Switzerland	2:14.32	Elie Gateau; France	2:14.69	Maximilian Lahnsteiner; Austria	2:15.47
Slalom	Istok Rodeš; Croatia	1:36.84	Frederik Norys; Germany	1:37.49	Elias Kolega; Croatia	1:37.69
Combined	Štefan Hadalin; Slovenia	1:56.16	Marcus Monsen; Norway	1:57.10	Istok Rodeš; Croatia	1:57.49

=== Women's events ===
Event	Gold		Silver		Bronze	
Downhill	Valérie Grenier; Canada	1:13.59	Beatrice Scalvedi; Switzerland	1:14.02	Nicol Delago; Italy	1:14.26
Super-G	Nina Ortlieb; Austria	1:10.48	Valérie Grenier; Canada	1:10.55	Verena Gasslitter; Italy	1:10.81
Giant Slalom	Jasmina Suter; Switzerland	2:12.39	Riikka Honkanen; Finland	2:12.62	Mélanie Meillard; Switzerland	2:12.66
Slalom	Elisabeth Willibald; Germany	1:37.41	Katharina Gallhuber; Austria	1:37.70	Katharina Huber; Austria	1:38.56
Combined	Aline Danioth; Switzerland	1:59.32	Katrin Hirtl-Stanggassinger; Germany	2:00.23	Saša Brezovnik; Slovenia	2:00.65

=== Team event ===
Event	Gold	Silver	Bronze
Team event	Slovenia; Saša Brezovnik; Meta Hrovat; Aljaž Dvornik; Štefan Hadalin	Sweden; Lovisa Grant; Lisa Hörnblad; Ludwig Cassman; Hannes Grym	Norway; Kristin Lysdahl; Thea Louise Stjernesund; Timon Haugan; Marcus Monsen
