= Beata (disambiguation) =

Beata may refer to:

== People ==
- Beata, the feminine form of the Latin (and Italian) title given to people who have been beatified
- Beata (and Beate), woman's given name; including list of people with the name
- Mario Beata (born 1974), Honduran retired soccer player

== Places ==
- Beata Island (Isla Beata), in Dominican Republic
- Cabo Beata, southernmost point of the island of Hispaniola, in the Dominican Republic

== Other uses ==
- Beata (spider), a genus of jumping spiders
- La Beata, a 1909 Argentine film

== See also ==
- Beat (disambiguation)
