= Beatrice Grasso =

Italian canoeist (born 1995)

Personal information
- Nationality: Italian
- Born: 24 November 1995 (age 30) Venice, Italy

Sport
- Sport: Canoeing
- Event: Wildwater canoeing
- Club: Canottieri Genovesi Elpis
- Coached by: Mauro Canzano
Medal record
Event	1st	2nd	3rd
World Championships	0	1	1
European Championships	0	0	5
Total	0	1	6

Beatrice Grasso (born 24 November 1995) is an Italian female canoeist who won two medals at senior level at the Wildwater Canoeing World Championships.
