= Beatrix de Rijke =

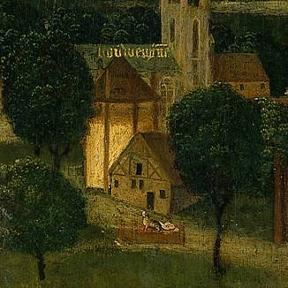
Detail of the St Elizabeth’s Day Flood, 18–19 November 1421, altar piece by Master of the St Elizabeth Panels, c.1490

Beatrix de Rijke (1421 – 1468) was a Dutch foundling in Dordrecht in 1421.

== Biography ==
According to Mathias Balen in his 1677 Description of the city of Dordrecht, the infant Beatrix was a survivor of the St. Elizabeth's flood (1421). Her wicker cradle was found floating on the water, containing her and a cat. The small cradle with baby and cat are included as one of the details of the 1490 panorama of the flood by the Master of the St Elizabeth Panels, on view at the Rijksmuseum in Amsterdam. The subject was romantic enough to be expanded over time. The baby was given the name Beatrix de Rijke, who married Jacob Roerom. She was also called Beatrix de Gelukkige (Beatrix the lucky one). The flood itself, first recording the loss of 18 villages, by 1677 had grown to encompass 72 villages. Today the story of the "cat in the cradle" is told at Kinderdijk, near Rotterdam, while the 1490 painting is said to have been donated as an altarpiece by the town of Wieldrecht, near Dordrecht.
