= Beatrice of Castile =

Beatrice of Castile may refer to:

- Beatrice of Castile (1242–1303), married to Afonso III of Portugal
- Beatrice of Castile, Marchioness of Montferrat (1254–1286), married to William VII, Marquess of Montferrat
- Beatrice of Castile (1293–1359), married to Afonso IV of Portugal
- Beatrice of Castile (died 1409), mother of Enrique Pérez de Guzmán, 2nd Count de Niebla
