= Beatrice Gelber =

American psychologist

- Education: Indiana University Bloomington
- Known for: Associative learning and conditioning in paramecia
- Scientific career
- Fields: Biology, experimental psychology
- Workplaces: University of Chicago

Beatrice Gelber is an American psychologist best known for her work on associative learning in protozoa, suggesting that synaptic plasticity is not an essential neurochemical mechanism for learning and memory.

== Education and career ==
She received a doctorate in psychology at Indiana University Bloomington under Roland Clark Davis. She held a professorship at University of Chicago until 1960, when she left to found the Basic Research Institute of Health.

== Research ==
Gelber is known for her research on the intracellular mechanisms of learning and behavior. She demonstrated that Paramecium aurelia could form associations after training, reminiscent of associative learning in multicellular organisms. She suggested that these behavior modifications could be produced through modification of biological macromolecules such as protein or RNA-protein complexes, influencing the dynamic equilibrium of said key molecules. Her findings were contested by contemporaries such as Donald D. Jensen, who criticized the use of protozoans in comparative learning studies.
