= Beatrix Pospíšilová Čelková =

Slovak antifascist activist and spy

- Born: 16 July 1925; Bratislava, Czechoslovakia
- Died: 2 June 1997 (aged 71); Trenčín, Slovakia
- Other name: Trixi
- Occupations: Spy, nurse, movie crew
- Known for: Providing intelligence for the 1944 bombing of the Apollo oil rafinery
- Spouse: Vojtech Čelka
- Children: 3
- Espionage activity
- Allegiance: Resistance in the Protectorate of Bohemia and Moravia; Flóra; Justícia
- Service years: 1936–1945

Beatrix Pospíšilová Čelková, (née Beatrix Pospíšilová, commonly known as Trixi; 16 July 1925 – 2 June 1997) was a Slovak antifascist activist and likely the youngest female industrial spy in World War II. She played an important role in bombing of the Apollo rafinery in Bratislava, earning her the nickname "Slovak Mata Hari".

Trixi was born to a Slovak mother and Moravian father in Bratislava. After the dissolution of the first Czechoslovak Republic, her father was not able to stay in Slovakia. Consequentially, Trixi's parents divorced and she moved to Prague with her father.

== Early life ==
In Prague Trixi studied at a high school, but it is said that studies did not interest her very much. She preferred to spend time with her aunt Františka Hrubišková, known also as the White Lady, who facilitated communication between rebels in the Protectorate of Bohemia and Moravia government led by Alois Eliáš and Slovak anti-fascists.

== Antifascist resistance ==
=== Activities in Prague ===
Trixi eventually quit school at the age of 16 and instead started working at the Barrandov film studios. The modern movie sets were frequently used by Nazi propaganda filmmakers, which provided Trixi an opportunity to use gather intelligence for the resistance using her fluent German and personal charm.

Trixi's activities eventually became suspicious. In 1942, after the assassination of a prominent Nazi Reinhard Heydrich by the resistance, 17-years old Trixi was arrested by Gestapo. No connection between the resistance between Trixi could be established and so she was let go. Nonetheless, the acquaintances in German intelligence warned Trixi that she is still suspected of having ties to the resistance.

=== Activities in Bratislava ===
In 1942 Trixi sought the help of Slovak consul in Prague who helped her obtain a - possibly fake - passport and return to Bratislava. Back in Bratislava, she continued working with her aunt for the benefit of the resistance as a part of the groups Flóra and Justícia. Eventually, she was forced to leave Bratislava after learning that the Gestapo still considered her a suspect and might pressure Slovak authorities to turn her over. Trixi hid in a sanatorium in the High Tatras and started publicly using a more typical Slovak name Božena instead of foreign sounding Beatrix or Trixi. In the sanatorium, she met her future husband, the lawyer Vojtech Čelka.

At the age of 19, Trixi returned to Bratislava on a new resistance assignment. Her target was the head of human resources of the Nazi controlled oil refinery Apollo (now Slovnaft) Vojtech Hudec. Hudec was a member of the fascist Slovak People's Party but the considered him vulnerable due to his Czech wife, love for popular music and womanizing tendencies. Trixi dyed her hair blonde as it was believed that Hudec had a preference for blond women and approached him under pretext of being a musician. Upon revealing her true mission, Hudec was reluctant to provide assistance but relented when Trixi reminded him of consequences of acting against the resistance once the war is over.

With the aid of Hudec, Trixi got a job at the refinery. She worked at the financial department but, due to her good command of the German language and pleasant demeanor, she was often tasked to accompany and sometimes interpret for the VIP guests from the German company IG Farben, which owned the rafinery. While working at the refinery, Trixi collected detailed information about production and layout of the premises, which she carried out of the factory hidden under her garter belt.

On 14 June 1944, the Apollo refinery was bombed by the allies. Trixi knew about the bombardment beforehand but came to work anyway to avoid raising suspicion. When the air raid sirens went off, many people failed to seek shelter because they did not believe the threat was real due to a history of false alarms and also because the refinery management prevented workers from seeking shelter as it interrupted production. As a result, there were 176 fatalities caused by the bombardment. Trixi had to help identify the dead colleagues and friends, which caused her life-long trauma.

== Aftermath ==
Trixi spent the rest of the war working undercover for the resistance. After the war, she married Čelka and moved with him to Trenčín, where her new husband's family owned a printing house. The marriage resulted in three sons. At first, her actions on behalf of the resistance were celebrated and she was invited to a reception attended by Marshall Malinovsky. Nonetheless, later the Communist regime turned against the non-communist former members of the resistance, accouching them of being loyal to Western powers. The property of Trixi's family was confiscated and many of her former friends and allies from the Justícia resistance group were imprisoned or forced to emigrate. Trixi herself likely avoided imprisonment only due to being pregnant at the time of the crackdown. For the rest of her active life, she worked as an oncology nurse.

After the Velvet Revolution, Trixi regained ownership of her husband's confiscated property. However, she did not get to enjoy quiet retirement. In 1996 two burglars entered her villa, tied her and made off with many valuables. The shock caused by the burglary contributed to her worsening health. Trixi died in 1997.
