= Beata Losman =

Swedish archivist

- Born: 27 November 1938 (age 87)
- Occupation: archivist

Wendela Beata Losman (née Hammarskjöld, born 27 November 1938, Malmö, Sweden) is a Swedish historian and archivist.

== Biography ==
Beata Hammarskjöld, later Losman through marriage, was born 27 November 1938 in Malmö. She is the daughter of the physician Sven Hammarskjöld and the librarian Birgit Lundberg.

She received a master's degree in Gothenburg in 1961, a licentiate in history in Gothenburg in 1965, and a doctoral degree at the University of Gothenburg in 1970.

Losman was employed at the Regional Archives in Gothenburg in 1962. She became senior archivist in 1972 and held a research position at the Humanities-Social Sciences Research Council in 1981–1985. She was acting Regional Archives during Gösta Lexts's illness 1975–1977, and became its head in 1987. She was chairman of the Foundation for Women's History Archive in Gothenburg and Lund from 1970, member of the board of the Forum for female researchers and women's research in Gothenburg from 1970, and treasurer there 1979–1986. In 1995, she competed with Anita Göransson for the professorship in women's history at the University of Gothenburg.

== Selected works ==
- Norden och reformkonsilierna 1408–1449 (akademisk avhandling, 1970)
- Kamp för ett nytt kvinnoliv (1980). ISBN 978-91-38-05413-0.
- Margareta Hvitfeldt. En biografi (1984)
- Kvinnor, män och barn på 1800-talets svenska landsbygd (1986). ISBN 978-91-7346-169-6.
- Kvinnoröster ur arkiven (1993)
- Från Eddan till Ellen Key: texter om och av kvinnor från medeltiden till 1900 (1993)
- –inte bara Göteborg: dokument ur de införlivade kommunernas historia (1996)
- Från vårdarinneutbildning till hälsohögskola (2000)
