= Béatrice Nirere =

Rwandan politician

- Born: Rwanda-Urundi
- Political party: FPR
- Conviction: Crime against humanity
- Penalty: Life imprisonment

Béatrice Nirere is a Rwandan politician who was convicted of genocide for her involvement in the 1994 Rwandan Genocide. At the time of her conviction in 2009, she was a member of the Chamber of Deputies of Rwanda, the country's lower house of parliament.

== Events ==
In 1993, Nirere was a deputy governor in charge of social affairs in the Byumba Prefecture. That year, she fled from advancing troops of the Rwandan Patriotic Front (FPR) and moved to a suburb of Kigali. Witnesses stated that during the 1994 Rwandan Genocide Nirere was a member of the Interahamwe militia that organised the massacre of ethnic Tutsis and moderate Hutus and that Nirere's influence with the militia derived from her political position. Nirere admitted to having handed out uniforms and other supplies to Interahamwe members, but she denied being otherwise affiliated with them. She was also accused of setting up and overseeing a roadblock where Tutsis were detained before they were killed.

In September 2008, Nirere was re-elected to the Chamber of Deputies as a member of the ruling FPR. Following a further five months as a member of parliament, she was charged with genocide and tried in a gacaca court in Giporoso, Gasabo District. On 2 March 2009, Nirere was found guilty of genocide and sentenced to life imprisonment. The question of Nirere's replacement in parliament was raised in the following May, as she had not yet been replaced by the FPR. The speaker of the house, Rose Mukantabana, raised the issue since a maximum of ten days is allowed by the parliamentary law.
