= Bea Lindhorst =

German politician (born 1985)

Member of the Landtag of Saxony-Anhalt
- Incumbent
- Assumed office 6 October 2026

Personal details
- Born: 1985 (age 40–41)
- Party: Alliance 90/The Greens

Beatrice Lindhorst (born 1985) is a German politician who was elected member of the Landtag of Saxony-Anhalt in 2026. She is the chairwoman of Alliance 90/The Greens in Wittenberg.
