= Beatrice Laura Goff =

American archaeologist and biblical scholar

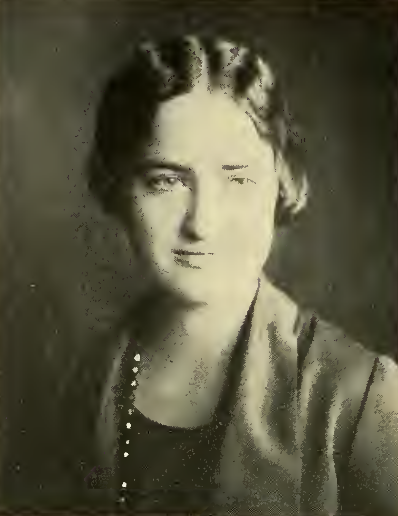
- Beatrice L. Goff, from the 1926 yearbook of Wellesley College
- Born: December 4, 1903; Andover, Massachusetts, United States
- Died: March 26, 1998 (aged 94); Suffolk County, Massachusetts, United States
- Education: Wellesley College; Boston University
- Occupations: archaeologist, biblical scholar
- Notable work: The Symbols of Prehistoric Mesopotamia

Beatrice Laura Goff (December 4, 1903–March 26, 1998) was an American archaeologist and biblical scholar. Her research focused on the analysis and interpretation of ceramic patterns of the ancient Near East and the relationship of those symbols to the literature and mythology of the time period.

== Early life and education ==
Beatrice Laura Goff was born December 4, 1903, in Andover, Massachusetts. She studied biblical and religious studies at Wellesley College, graduating with a BA and MA in 1928. She went on to pursue her doctorate at Boston University. In 1931 Goff spent a semester doing research in Palestine. She was granted a PhD in 1933.

== Career ==
Unable to find a teaching position at a major university after graduation, Goff worked as an assistant to various professors of religious studies. In 1936, she was hired as a researcher at Yale University under Professor Erwin Goodenough. Goff went on to study library sciences at Columbia University after being unable to find a permanent position at Yale. She eventually was hired as an adjunct professor of religion at Randolph Macon- Woman's College in Lynchburg, Virginia. She later accepted a position as assistant professor at Mount Holyoke Women's College in Massachusetts. She resigned before finishing her contract because of her discouragement over the lack of biblical scholarship opportunities available to her.

In 1946, Goff was hired as executive director of the YWCA in Springfield, Indiana. She later returned to Yale as Erwin Goodenough's research assistant and worked at Yale for the next twenty years. During her time at Yale, Goff furthered her studies in Akkadian, Sumerian and Egyptian languages, and participated in research trips to Iraq in 1958 and Egypt in 1965–1966. She published her findings from her research trips in two books: Symbols of Prehistoric Mesopotamia in 1963 and Symbols of Ancient Egypt in the Late Period in 1979.

In the early 1980s, Goff developed eye problems and could no longer do research. Goff died March 26, 1998, in Suffolk, Massachusetts

== Selected publications ==
- Goff, Beatrice (1934). The lost Jahwistic account of the conquest of Canaan. Society of Biblical Literature and Exegesis.
- Goff, Beatrice (1963). Symbols of Prehistoric Mesopotamia. Yale University Press. pp. 315. ISBN 978-0300004960.
- Goff, Beatrice (1979). Symbols of Ancient Egypt in the Late Period. Mouton. p. 309. ISBN 9789027976222.
