= Beatrice Partridge =

English-born New Zealand painter

Beatrice Partridge (1866–1963) was an English-born New Zealand painter. Her work is held in the permanent collection of Christchurch Art Gallery.

== Biography ==
Partridge was born in Devon, England and migrated to New Zealand with her family around 1877. The family lived in Timaru, in the South Island, for a time. In the 1880s, Partridge and her sister Florence moved to Christchurch to attend Canterbury College School of Art.

In 1887, Partridge became a working member of the Canterbury Society of Arts. She also exhibited with the New Zealand Academy of Fine Arts and held her last exhibition at the age of 96. Her paintings feature landscapes and still lifes.
