= Mademoiselle Beatrice =

Founder of a touring theatre company

Marie Beatrice Binda, known professionally as Mademoiselle Beatrice (5 August 1839 – 22 December 1878), born in Italy and with aristocratic connections in France, was an actress in England and founder of a touring theatre company.

== Life ==
=== Family background ===
Beatrice was born in Lucca. Her father, Chevalier Binda, was the British Consul at Florence and Leghorn, and was later in the service of the Imperial Court of Napoleon III. Early in life, because of political offences, he lived in England for 17 years, staying for much of this time at Chatsworth House and Holland House, and meeting many of the political, literary, and aristocratic celebrities of the day. Beatrice's mother was a granddaughter of the Marquise de Lage de Volude, the principal maid of honour to Marie Antoinette.

=== Career beginnings ===
When her father became ill ("seized with paralysis"), his income was reduced. Beatrice, deciding on a career on stage to assist her family, entered the Conservatoire de Paris, and obtained a first prize. Her first stage appearance was at the Théâtre de l'Odéon, as the heroine in a French version of The Stranger by August von Kotzebue. She appeared, by special command of the Empress, at the Royal Opera of Versailles as the Countess in The Marriage of Figaro. She was selected by Alexandre Dumas fils for the heroine in his play L'Ami des femmes, but the death of her father prevented her from accepting it.

=== In England ===
She was encouraged to try the stage in England, and was brought to England under the escort of Lady Holland and Henry Greville; she was for a time a guest at Holland House. Her London debut, under the name of Lucchesini, was in October 1864, at the Haymarket Theatre in the lead role in Mademoiselle de Belle Isle by Alexandre Dumas, adapted by Fanny Kemble. In November of the same year she appeared there in The Stranger; a reviewer in The Athenaeum wrote: "Mdlle. Beatrice as Mrs. Haller is fitted with a part that might have been invented for such an actress. Beautiful, elegant, and Italian, highly polished in her style of art, with manners extremely refined, we have almost the ideal of Kotzebue's heroine. ...." In the same month she appeared at the same theatre in an adaptation of Der Sonnenwendhof by Salomon Hermann Mosenthal.

In the following years, she appeared mostly in theatres outside London.

=== Her theatre company ===
In February 1869 Mademoiselle Beatrice returned to London in the title role of Marie Antoinette by Palgrave Simpson. She did not make a permanent engagement with a theatre; instead in 1870, she established her own "comedy-drama" company, which toured the country, and which sometimes appeared in the summer season in London. The plays she presented were mostly translations of French plays. Notable actors and actresses in the company included Thomas Bilton Appleby, James Carter-Edwards, Edward John George, Frank Harvey, Louise Moodie, Charlotte Saunders, Henry Sinclair, Thomas Edmund Wenman and Sophie Young.

In May 1872 at the Olympic Theatre she presented Our Friends. a version of Nos Intime by Victorien Sardou. In August 1874 at the Haymarket Theatre she presented Le Sphinx by Octave Feuillet, and Our Friends. In August 1875 she presented at the Globe Theatre Monsieur Alphonse by Campbell Clarke, adapted from a play by Alexander Dumas fils. In July 1876 she revived some of these plays.

In August 1878 at the Olympic Theatre she played the lead role with her company in The Woman of the People (Marie-Jeanne, ou la femme du peuple by Adolphe d'Ennery and Julien de Mallian), already successfully performed on tour. The continued tour with this play was cut short by her death on 22 December 1878, aged 39.

An obituarist in The Era (29 December 1878) wrote: "She invested the characters she portrayed with a grace, a refinement, and a charm peculiarly her own, and in her own particular line she had no rival. Her company, too, was always noted for its excellence, many of its present members being in it from its organization. .... Mdlle. Beatrice did not count her admirers amongst her audience alone. Her great kindness of heart, her high sense of justice, her charm of manner, made her a special favourite with everyone with whom she came in contact...."

After a requiem mass at the Pro-Cathedral in Kensington, her remains were interred in the family vault at Père Lachaise Cemetery in Paris.
