= Wieldrecht =

Coordinates: 51°47′N 4°39′E

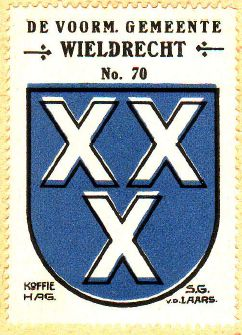
- Coat of arms

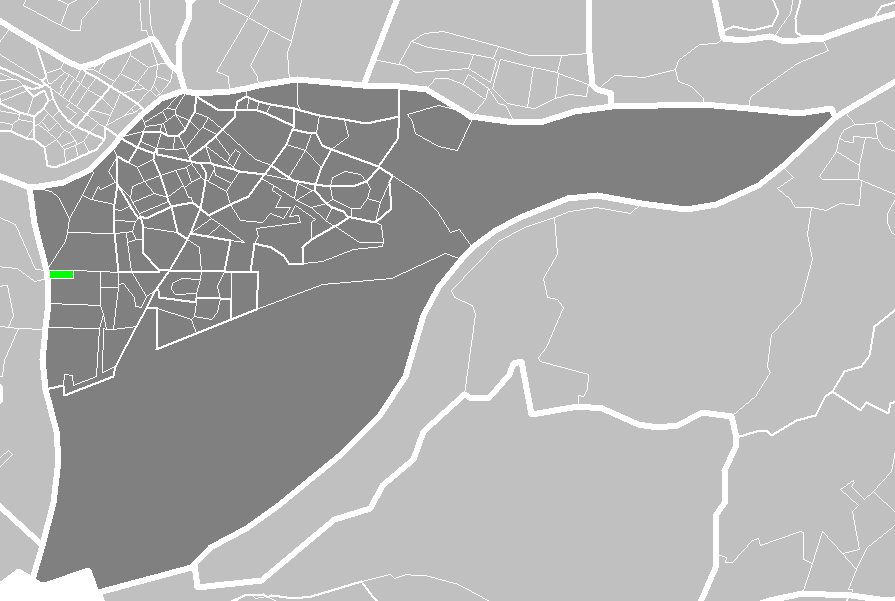
- Country: Netherlands
- Province: South Holland
- Municipality: Dordrecht

Population (2007)
  - Total: 163

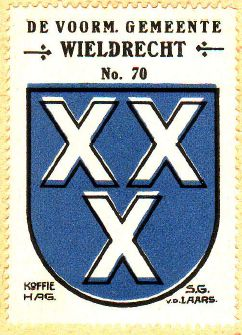
Coat of arms of the former municipality

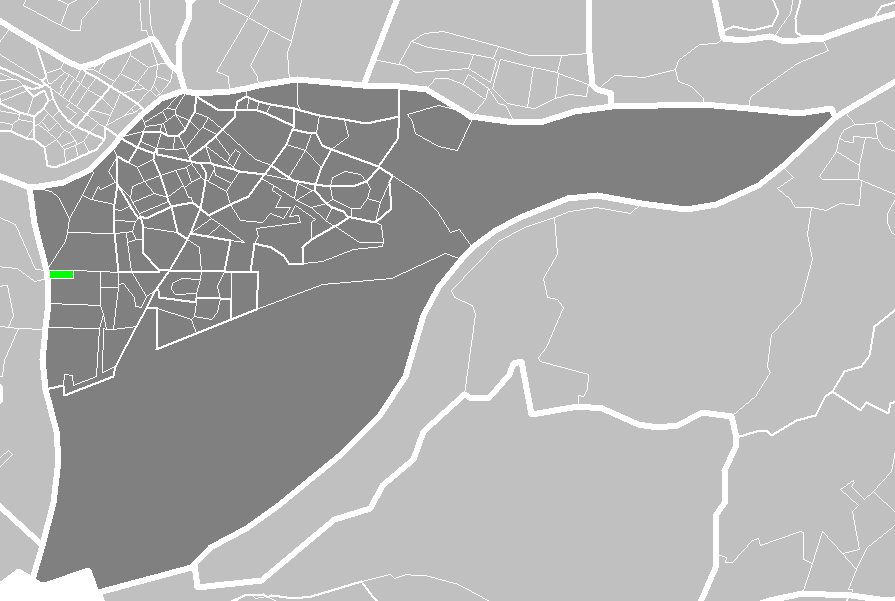
Location of Wieldrecht in Dordrecht

Wieldrecht is a small village in the Dutch province of South Holland. It is located about 4 km southwest of the city of Dordrecht, on the Kil River.

Wieldrecht was a separate municipality between 1817 and 1857, when it became part of Dubbeldam.
