= Beatrice Krauss =

Beatrice H. Krauss
- Born: August 4, 1903; Honolulu, Hawai'i
- Died: March 5, 1998 (aged 94)
- Occupations: botanist, professor, educator, historian
- Known for: ethnobotany of Hawaii

Academic background
- Education: University of Hawaiʻi at Mānoa
- Thesis: The Transpiration of Pineapple Plants (Ananas sativus) (1930)
- Doctoral advisor: C. D. Sideris

Beatrice Kapua'Okalani H. Krauss (August 4, 1903 – March 5, 1998) was a botanist, teacher, and historian from Hawai'i who specialized in the indigenous flora and ethnobotany of the islands.

== Early life ==
Beatrice Hilmer Krauss was born in Honolulu on the island of Hawai'i to Frederick Krauss and Elizabeth Hilmer, first generation Americans of German descent. Her father taught at the Kamehameha Schools starting in 1901 and later taught as an agronomist at the College of Hawaii. The family moved from San Francisco in 1902, settling in the Manoa Valley. Frederick Krauss was granted a 50-acre homestead on Maui in 1912 and Beatrice with her older sister and two younger brothers contributed to the family's farm. The family would later move back to Honolulu when the children were of age to attend college.

== Education ==
Krauss was educated at Punahou School and on Maui, where she was active in theatre and editor-in-chief of her high school year book. She graduated from the University of Hawai'i with a B.A. Sc. in 1926, where she was the first woman to take the full curriculum in agriculture. She would later spend a year studying at the University of Berlin in 1927 and also studied at Cornell University.

== Career ==
Following her graduation, Krauss was hired as an Assistant Plant Physiologist at the Pineapple Research Institute in Honolulu, where she was the first female staff member. She would work 15 years at the institute before being promoted to Associate and made a lower salary than her male colleagues.

Krauss was involved in research that led to advances in the use of plant regulators in agriculture to improve the nutritional value and productivity of commercial varieties of pineapple, and presented on her work internationally. She worked primarily as a plant physiologist and morphologist. She spent time in the Canary Islands and the Azores studying pineapple cultivation.

After 42 years with the Pineapple Research Institute, Krauss retired in 1968. She volunteered at the University of Hawaii for six years teaching and conducting research on ethnobotany on the island.

Beginning in 1974, Kraus worked at the Lyon Arboretum a research complex run by the university, where she delivered popular seminars on the history of the Manoa Valley and the ethnobotany of Indigenous Hawaiians. She retired from that work in 1992. A garden was later named in her honor at the institution.

== Opposition to loyalty oath and red-baiting ==
Kraus did not receive a salary during her time at the University of Hawaii as she refused to sign the compulsory loyalty oath, a requirement implemented in 1941 in the midst of distrust of Japanese people living in Hawaii during World War II. During WWI, her father, as a German American, had been required to travel regularly to the mainland to reaffirm his loyalty to the United States.

In 1948, Kraus was one of four people who testified in defense of John Reinecke and his wife Aiko (née Tokimasa), who were accused of being communists. As teachers and labor organizers, the couple had been ousted by their school and attempts were made to revoke their teaching licenses. Krauss testified that the couple's political beliefs had nothing to do with their competencies as teachers. When Reinecke and other labor organizers including Jack Wayne Hall were convicted under the Smith Act in 1953, Kraus opposed and publicly protested the entire proceedings.

In 1973 Krauss led a group that tried to save Gilmore Hall and neighboring trees on the UH campus from demolition. Though she helped place the building on the Hawai‘i Register of Historic Places, the Hall was torn down to make way for a new art building. A balbao tree was saved after Krauss chained herself to it in protest.

== Advocacy for Hawaiian History and Culture ==
After her retirement, Kraus was active in protesting the demolition of historical buildings and trees, including Gilmore Hall at the University of Hawaii, as well as industrial development in the Manoa Valley. She helped found the Manoa History Project which published books on the history of the valley and advocated on the preservation and restoration of Hawaii's forests.

== Selected publications ==
- Krauss, B. H., & Greig, T. F. (1994). Plants in Hawaiian culture. Univ. of Hawaii Press.
- Krauss, B. H., & Harold L. Lyon Arboretum (Honolulu, H. (1988). Ethnobotany of the Hawaiians. University of Hawaii Press for Harold L. Lyon Arboretum.
- Krauss, B. H., & Harold L. Lyon Arboretum (Honolulu, H. (1981). Native plants used as medicine in Hawaii. Harold L. Lyon Arboretum, University of Hawaii at Manoa.
- Krauss, B. H., & Harold L. Lyon Arboretum (Honolulu, H. (1980). Creating a Hawaiian ethnobotanical garden. Harold L. Lyon Arboretum, University of Hawaii.
- Krauss, Beatrice H. (1970). Bibliography of Macadamia. Hawaii Agricultural Experiment Station. OCLC 499161814.
- Krauss, Beatrice H. (June 1949). "Anatomy of the Vegetative Organs of the Pineapple Ananas comosus (L.) Merr.-Concluded. III. The Root and the Cork". Botanical Gazette. 110 (4): 550–587. doi:10.1086/335557. JSTOR 2472662. S2CID 83610881.
- Krauss, B. H. & Pineapple Research Institute of Hawaii. (1948). Use of BNA sprays to delay ripening, improve pineapple yields & fruit shape: A report on results, methods and problems. Pineapple Research Institute of Hawaii.
- Krauss, B. H. & Pineapple Research Institute of Hawaii. (1942). The effect of drought conditions during different stages of plant development on the size and quality of fruit produced. Pineapple Research Institute of Hawaii.
- Krauss, B. H., Pineapple Producers Cooperative Association, & Experiment Station. (1940). Pineapple culture on the island of São Miguel, Azores. Experiment Station of the Pineapple Producers Cooperative Association.
- Krauss, Beatrice H. (1930). The Transpiration of Pineapple Plants (Ananas sativus) (Thesis). ProQuest 2561939889.
