= Bee Jackson =

American actress and dancer (1903–1933)

- Bee Jackson dancing the Charleston at the Piccadilly Hotel cabaret, London in 1926
- Born: Beatrice Adelaide Jackson; 12 January 1903; Brooklyn, New York, U.S.
- Died: 18 July 1933 (aged 30); Chicago Heights, Illinois, U.S.
- Other names: Miss Flying Feet; Charleston Queen
- Occupations: Actress; dancer; model
- Years active: 1921–1933

Beatrice Adelaide "Bee" Jackson (January 12, 1903 – July 18, 1933) was an American actress and dancer who gained international prominence during the Jazz Age. Beginning her career as a chorus performer in Broadway revues such as the Ziegfeld Follies, she rose to solo stardom in Manhattan cabarets and on international vaudeville circuits as a leading exponent of the Charleston.

Billed in promotional materials as Miss Flying Feet and the Charleston Queen, Jackson helped introduce the Charleston to mainstream white audiences in the United States and Europe during the mid-1920s. In the late 1920s and early 1930s, she toured continental Europe performing the rhumba before her death at age 30 from complications following an appendectomy.

== Early life ==
Beatrice Adelaide Jackson was born on January 12, 1903, in Brooklyn, New York. Her parents, Frederick Emerson Jackson (1877–1959) and Grace Evelyn Kendall (born 1879), were Brooklyn natives who married in April 1901. She had one sister, Doris.

Frederick Jackson worked as a traveling salesman and lived apart from his family for extended periods before relocating to El Paso, Texas, in the 1910s to work as a farmer. Grace Jackson raised Beatrice and Doris primarily as a single mother in Brooklyn and later spent part of Beatrice's childhood in Bound Brook, New Jersey. Grace worked as a stage actress and subsequently served as her daughter's full-time theatrical manager.

Jackson received no formal dance instruction as a child, instead practicing steps to records played on a home phonograph. By age 15, she had gained local notice for her dancing and appeared in the ingenue role in an amateur production of The Earl and the Girl.

== Career ==
=== Broadway and early cabaret work (1921–1924) ===
At age 18, while visiting New York City with her mother, Jackson auditioned for the Shubert theatrical organization and entered the Broadway chorus line. She made her Broadway debut in The Midnight Rounders of 1921 (opened February 7, 1921) at the Century Roof, followed by ensemble roles in The Whirl of New York (June 1921) at the Winter Garden Theatre and the Al Jolson musical Bombo (October 1921).

She joined the chorus of Florenz Ziegfeld's Ziegfeld Follies of 1922 (June 1922 – June 1923) and returned for the summer edition of the Ziegfeld Follies of 1923 (June–September 1923), alongside an appearance in the Shubert revue Artists and Models (1923).

Seeking a specialty act to advance beyond chorus work, Jackson studied the Charleston after watching the landmark 1923 African American Broadway musical Runnin' Wild, which featured James P. Johnson's tune The Charleston and choreography by Elida Webb. Jackson took lessons from Webb and adapted the movements into a solo routine. In early 1924, theatrical agent Harry Bestry booked her as a solo specialty dancer at New York's Silver Slipper nightclub. After the club was closed by Prohibition authorities in June 1924, radio announcer Nils Thor Granlund introduced her to hostess Texas Guinan, who hired Jackson to headline at the El Fey Club. She also performed regularly at Harry Richman's Club Richman.

=== International Charleston fame (1925–1926) ===
By 1925, Jackson was headlining major vaudeville houses, including B.F. Keith's Palace Theatre and the New York Hippodrome, and appeared in the silent feature drama Lying Wives (1925) directed by Ivan Abramson.

In late 1925, Jackson traveled to Europe, where she sparked a widespread Charleston craze in London. She headlined the midnight cabaret at the Piccadilly Hotel, performed at the Kit Cat Club, and appeared in Paris revues. During her London run, she filmed the British Pathé short Miss Flying Feet (1925), which demonstrated her signature stage routine: executing rapid inward-and-outward foot pivots, crossing leg twists, and swinging arm movements inside a chalked floor square measuring roughly one meter across.

Returning to the United States in early 1926, Jackson toured winter resort clubs in Miami, Palm Beach, and Havana. Later that year, she returned to Broadway in Ziegfeld's No Foolin' (1926) and appeared in Will Morrissey's Music Hall Revue (1926) alongside a young Bing Crosby.

=== Origins controversy and 1926 Charleston visit ===
Beginning in 1925, Jackson and her mother-manager promoted her in press releases and theater billings as the "originator" of the Charleston and the "first white person in this country to ever dance it professionally". In August 1925, Grace Jackson wrote to the Charleston, South Carolina, Chamber of Commerce proposing an official visit, claiming Beatrice had invented the dance two years earlier after watching African American dockworkers on the Charleston waterfront.

Dance historians, including Charleston County Public Library historian Nic Butler, have refuted these claims as publicity fabrications. The Charleston originated in South Carolina's African American Gullah Geechee community and was carried to Harlem in the early 20th century by Lowcountry migrants and youth musicians of Charleston's Jenkins Orphanage Band, before being codified for Broadway by Black performers and choreographers such as Elida Webb.

In April 1926, at the invitation of Charleston civic leaders seeking national tourism publicity, Jackson visited the city from April 14 to 17. Although Mayor Thomas Stoney declined her request to be awarded the keys to the city, Jackson attended local society events and was filmed on April 17 by Fox and Pathé newsreel crews. The footage, shot at White Point Garden and outside the Jenkins Orphanage on Franklin Street, captured Jackson dancing alongside the Jenkins Orphanage Band and local children.

=== Later career and rhumba tours (1927–1933) ===
As public interest in the Charleston waned in the late 1920s, Jackson shifted her repertoire to Latin dance. Between 1927 and 1932, she toured extensively across continental Europe including engagements in Berlin, Vienna, and Constantinople performing and popularizing the rhumba. During her time in Germany, she also reportedly appeared in a German language sound film.

Jackson returned to the United States in 1932 and appeared at New York's Palace Theatre on a bill with bandleader Noble Sissle. In July 1933, she traveled to the Chicago area to rehearse for a new nightclub revue at the Paramount Club.

== Personal life ==
Jackson never married and had no children. Throughout her adult life, she lived and traveled closely with her mother, Grace, who managed her career and publicity.

== Death ==
In July 1933, while rehearsing in Chicago, Jackson suffered an acute attack of appendicitis. She underwent emergency surgery in Chicago Heights, Illinois, but developed post-operative complications and died on July 18, 1933, at age 30.

== Filmography ==
=== Film ===
Year	Title	Role	Notes
1925	Lying Wives	Betty Lee	Silent feature film directed by Ivan Abramson
1925	Miss Flying Feet	Herself	British Pathé silent short filmed in London
1926	The "Charleston" in Charleston	Herself	Fox Newsreel outtakes filmed with the Jenkins Orphanage Band

== Stage ==
=== Theatre ===
Year	Title	Role(s)	Venue(s)	Notes
1921	The Midnight Rounders of 1921	Performer	Century Roof, Broadway	
1921	The Whirl of New York	Ensemble	Winter Garden Theatre, Broadway	
1921–1922	Bombo	Ensemble	Jolson's 59th Street Theatre, Broadway	
1922–1923	Ziegfeld Follies of 1922	Performer	New Amsterdam Theatre, Broadway	
1923	Ziegfeld Follies of 1923	Performer	New Amsterdam Theatre, Broadway	
1923	Artists and Models	Performer	Shubert Theatre, Broadway	
1924	The Silver Slipper	Solo specialty dancer	New York cabaret revue	
1926	No Foolin'	Dancer	Globe Theatre, Broadway	
1926	Will Morrissey's Music Hall Revue	Dancer	Broadway / touring revue	
