= Bienheuré =

Saint Bienheuré
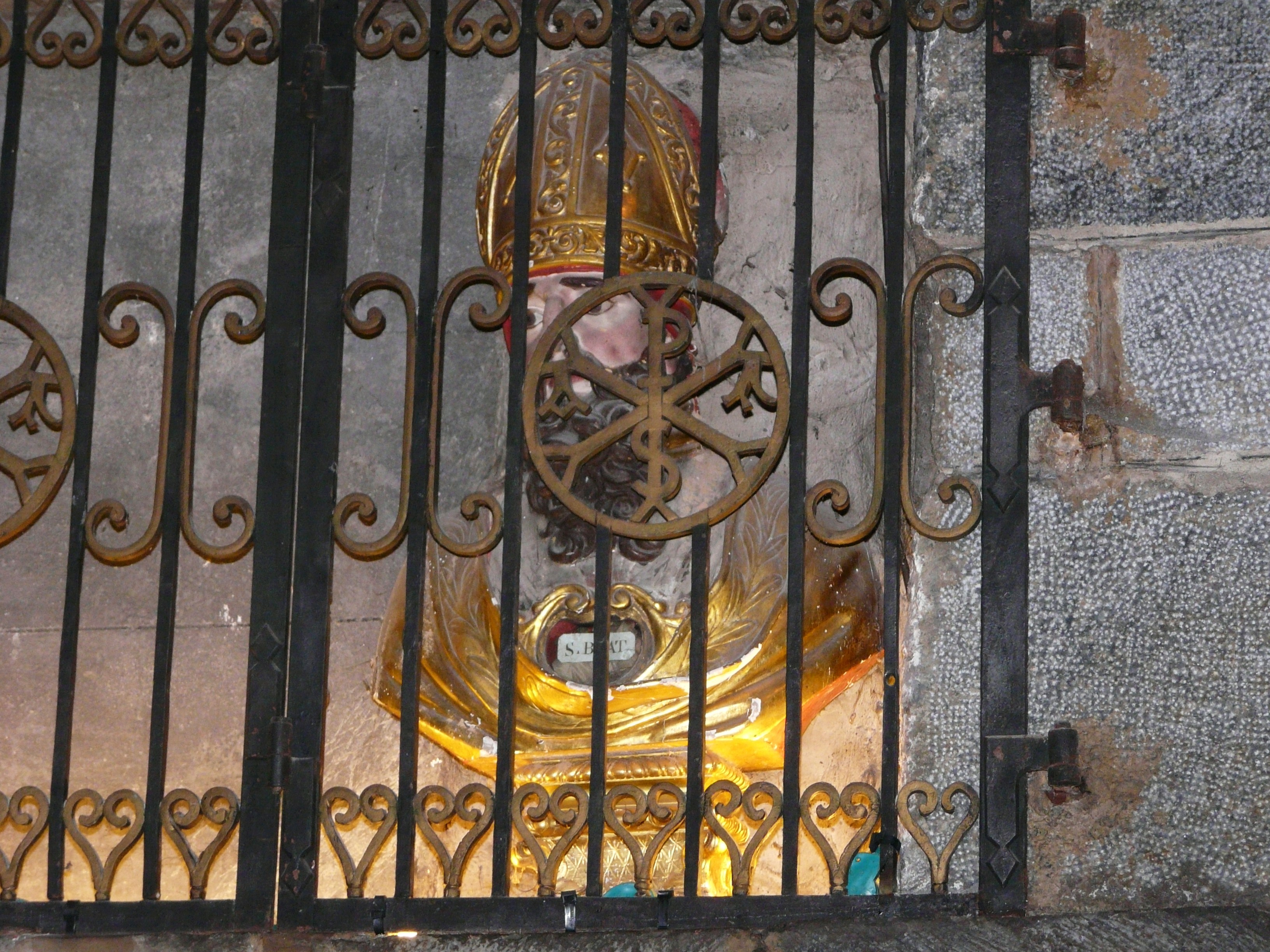
- Bust of Saint Beatus, église Saint-Béat Saint-Privat, Saint-Béat, Haute-Garonne, France.
- Died: 3rd century
- Venerated in: Eastern Orthodox Church; Roman Catholic Church
- Feast: May 9

Saint Bienheuré (Bié, Beatus) is a semi-legendary saint of Vendôme. Tradition states that he lived in a cave near the town. Like Saint George, he is said to have fought a dragon. His legend was conflated with that of Beatus of Lungern.

== Legend ==
The legend states that Bienheuré fasted and prayed before fighting the dragon. According to the legend, the dragon was so large that when it went to drink from a river at some distance away, its tail still lay in its cave. It was also so large that it drained the Loir when it drank from it. There are three versions of this combat: the first states that the dragon fled at the sight of Saint Bienheuré; the second version states that Saint Bienheuré defeated the dragon with one blow from his staff; the third states that the dragon strangled itself with its chain.

== Historicity ==
Bienheuré is identified with a missionary who traveled and preached in, besides Vendôme, Garonne, Laon, and Nantes. His place of death is considered to have been Chevresson, near Laon.

== Veneration ==
A chapel dating from the fifth century was built on the hillside where he is said to have lived.

L'Association du Faubourg Saint Bienheuré organizes an annual festival in honor of the saint on the second Sunday of May.
