= Beatrice Domond =

American skateboarder

Personal information
- Full name: Beatrice Domond
- Born: January 7, 1995 (age 31) Miami, Florida, U.S.

Sport
- Sport: Skateboarding

Beatrice Domond (born 1995) is an American regular-footed American skateboarder from Miami, Florida.

== Early life and education ==
Domond moved to West Palm Beach, Florida when she was 4. She started skating at the age of 7. Domond earned her associate degree from Florida Atlantic University.

== Skateboarding career ==
As a young skater in South Florida, Domond began an email exchange with skateboard filmmaker Bill Strobeck. She began sending him short clips of her skating, which Strobeck started showing to other skaters including Jason Dill. Domond gradually gained a fanbase within a small community of professional skateboarders, mostly based in NYC. Through the support of Jason Dill and Bill Strobeck, Beatrice got on Fucking Awesome's skate team. Beatrice received her first box from FA in September, 2013. In May 2018, Dill officially put Beatrice on the FA team as a sponsored amateur.

In 2014, Domond performed a trick, a no-comply impossible, in the Supreme "Cherry" video by Bill Strobeck. The following year in 2015, Domond made the list of 5 young female skaters to watch out for by I-D Magazine. She was listed alongside Allysha Bergado, Alana Smith, Anne-Sophie Julien, and Leo Baker.

In 2016, Domond made the list of Girls Who Shred: 5 Stylin' Female Skateboarders to Follow on Instagram Now published by Vogue. In 2018, Domond modeled for Thom Browne's Golf Collection.

In 2019, she appeared in the Boys Of Summer 2 video by Logan Lara. She appeared in the 2019 Supreme video CANDYLAND directed by William Strobeck. Domond's tricks follow Cher Strauberry's appearance in the video.

In 2020, Domond featured on the cover of the December issue of Juice skateboarding magazine.

Her sponsors include Vans, Supreme, Venture, Spitfire, and Boys of Summer.
