= Beat W. Hess =

Swiss lawyer and businessman (born 1949)

- Born: 6 July 1949 (age 77); Lucerne, Switzerland
- Education: University of Geneva; University of Miami School of Law; University of Fribourg
- Occupation: Businessman

Beat W. Hess (born 6 July 1949) is a Swiss lawyer and businessman. He is the chairman of the Holcim Group and the vice chairman of Sonova.

He is a member of The Trilateral Commission.

== Early life ==
Beat W. Hess was born on 6 July 1949. He graduated from the University of Geneva in 1972 and a JD in Legal Management in 1974. He earned a master of laws from the University of Miami School of Law in 1976, and a doctorate in Laws from the University of Fribourg in 1977.

== Career ==
Hess began his legal career as a clerk to Swiss courts in 1972. He was the legal counsel of Brown, Boveri & Cie from 1977 to 1986, and its general counsel from 1986 to 1988. He was the general counsel of the ABB Group from 1988 to 2003. He was the legal director and a member of the execute committee of Royal Dutch Shell from 2004 to 2010.

Hess joined the board of directors of the Holcim Group in 2010 and currently serves as its chairman.

Hess is also the vice chairman of Sonova. Additionally, he serves on the board of directors of Nestlé. He also serves on the advisory board of the China Development Bank.
