= Béa González =

Spanish novelist

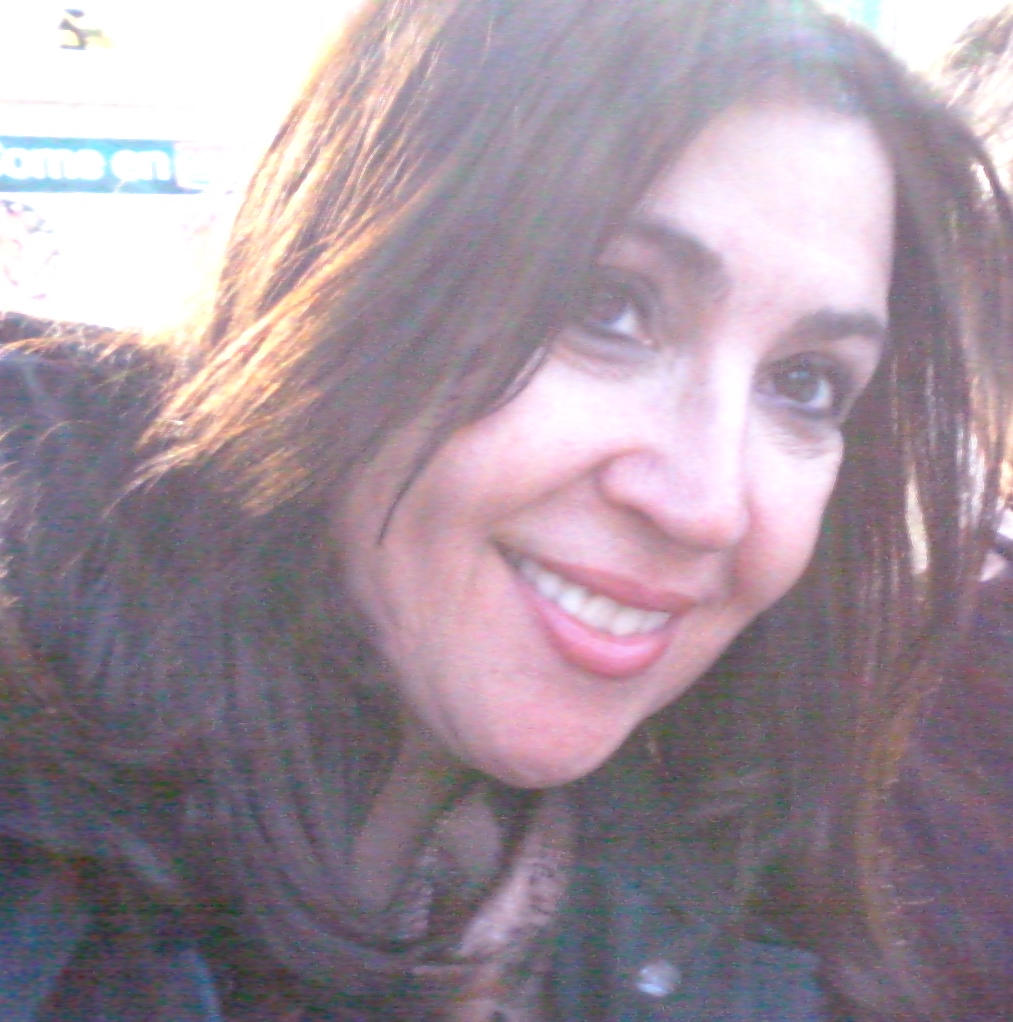
Béa González, 2013

Béa González /ˈbeɪ.ə/ is a novelist.

== Biography ==
She was born Beatriz González in Vigo, Spain, and emigrated to Canada as a child.

Following studies in Spain and Toronto, she pursued postgraduate studies in London, where she received an MA in Literary and Historical Studies from King's College London.

González is the author of many articles, literary essays and reviews. She is the author of two novels, the first, The Bitter Taste of Time, was published in 1998, and is set in Spain during and after the Spanish Civil War. Her second novel, The Mapmaker's Opera, was published in 2005, and is set in the Yucatán Peninsula, Mexico at the beginning of the Mexican Revolution. To date, her books have been published in seven countries, and the rights have been acquired by the Australian composer, Kevin Purcell, to make The Mapmaker's Opera into a musical.

She is also a lecturer and educator and designs and leads tours to Spain and Latin America to study their poets and writers.

== Selected works ==
- The Bitter Taste of Time (1998)
- The Mapmaker's Opera (2005)
- Invocation (2023)
