= Beatriz Ghirelli =

Argentine engineer (1915-1992)

- Born: 30 April 1915; Buenos Aires
- Died: 11 September 1992 (aged 77)
- Education: National University of La Plata
- Occupation: Engineer
- Spouse: Miguel Gustavo Francisco Ciaburri
- Children: 2

Beatriz Ghirelli de Ciaburri (30 April 1915 – 11 September 1992) was an Argentine engineer and a pioneer of standardisation practices.

== Early life and education ==
Beatriz Ghirelli was born in Buenos Aires on 30 April 1915. She graduated as a Mechanical and Electrical Engineer in 1938, the first woman to graduate in the subject from National University of La Plata, and the second woman in Argentina to earn the qualification.

== Career ==
She worked at the Instituto Argentino de Normalización y Certificación (IRAM), and was appointed Director in 1953. There she dedicated herself to standardisation, setting up the process for applications for the IRAM seal of approval. As Technical Director of IRAM, on 6 April 1957 she gave a speech on the standardisation of materials for LS-10 Radio Libertad, stating that standardisation was the way to improve productivity, as it offered "a true economic benefit and a better standard of living."

Ghirelli's task was to raise awareness of and convince the production and consumption sectors of the advantages of adopting quality mark systems. Her work would take her beyond Argentina, promoting the formation of a Pan-American Committee of Technical Standards.

The Comisión Panamericana de Normas Técnicas (COPANT) (the Pan American Commission for Technical Standards) was created in 1949 in São Paulo. At their 27 April 1961 meeting in Montevideo, Beatriz Ghirelli de Ciaburri was appointed General Secretary, and became the nerve centre of the organisation. She concluded her term as Director General of IRAM in 1980 and was later appointed Honorary Secretary in 1988.

She was director of the Instituto Argentino de Grasas y Aceites (IAGA) (Argentine Institute of Fats and Oils) and ended her career as the General Director of IRAM in 1980, where she was named Honorary President. In June 1969 she became a member of the Asociación Argentina de los Químicos y Técnicos de la Industria del Cuero (Argentine Association of Chemists and Technicians in the Leather Industry).

== Personal life ==
She married civil engineer Miguel Gustavo Francisco Ciaburri, who died at the age of 65 as vice president of the Argentine construction company Benito Roggio and Sons. They had two children.

Beatriz Ghirelli de Ciaburri died on 11 September 1992, aged 77.

== Recognition ==
The Fundación Amigos del Casco Histórico de la Ciudad Autónoma de Buenos Aires (The Friends of the Historic Center of the Autonomous City of Buenos Aires Foundation) held a tribute to Ing. Beatriz Ghirelli de Ciaburri on 30 April 2004 in San Lorenzo 317, Buenos Aires.

Pablo J. Benia commemorated Ghirelli in an obituary for the Comisión Panamericana de Normas Técnicas writing "Que quienes lean estas líneas le rindan con su pensamiento el justiciero homenaje a quien fue un faro que iluminó a toda América para señalarnos el camino de la unión." ("Let those who read these lines pay with their thoughts the righteous homage to who was a lighthouse that illuminated all of America to point us towards a union."
