= Beatrice of Navarre =

Beatrice of Navarre may refer to:

- Beatrice of Navarre, Duchess of Burgundy (1242–1295), daughter of Theobald I of Navarre
- Beatrice of Navarre, Countess of La Marche (1386–1410), daughter of Charles III of Navarre
