= Beatrice Scalvedi =

Swiss alpine skier (born 1995)

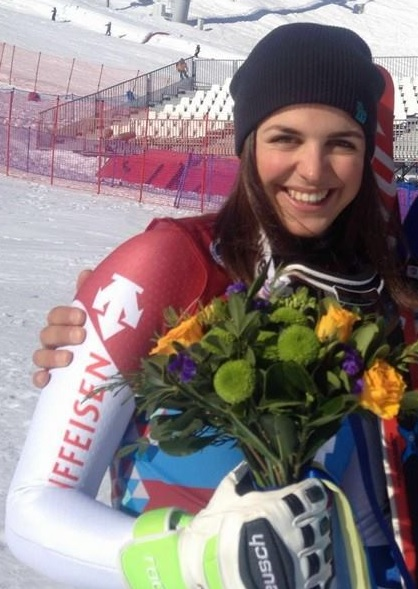

Personal information
- Born: 27 June 1995 (age 31) Bellinzona, Switzerland

Skiing career
- Sport: Alpine skiing
- Club: Sci Club Greina Campo Blenio
- Retired: 2018
- Disciplines: Speed events
- World Cup debut: 2016

Beatrice Scalvedi (born 23 June 1995 in Bellinzona) is a Swiss former alpine skier who won the silver medal in downhill at the World Junior Alpine Skiing Championships 2016 and started one World Cup race in the same year.

Having her career limited because of various injuries, she was forced to retire in 2018 due to back problems after more than one year of inactivity. After retiring from professional sports, she began studying psychology; in the following years, she publicly disclosed the difficulties she encountered following her early retirement from competitions, a situation that led her to a period of depression, during which she lamented the substantial lack of assistance and support from the major Swiss sports organizations, such as Swiss Ski and the Swiss Olympic Association.
