= Beatrix Waring McCay =

Beatrix Waring McCay, Lady Reid
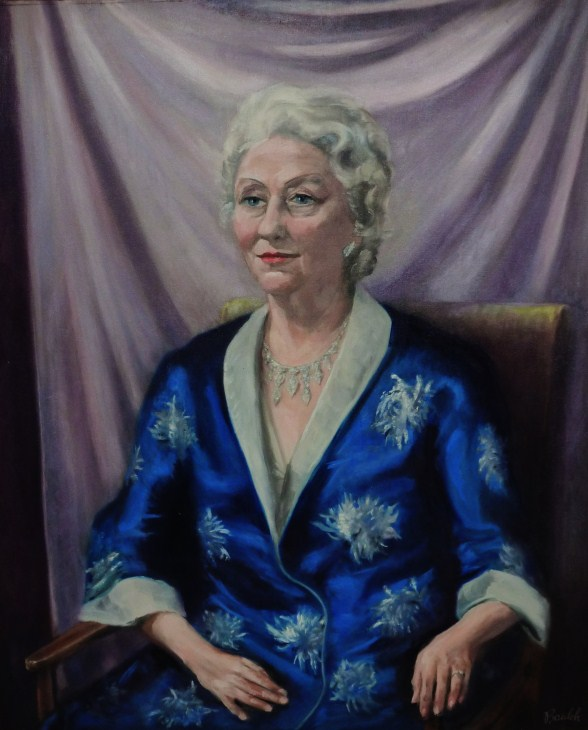
- Portrait of Beatrix McCay by Douglas Baulch, 1967
- Born: 8 January 1901; Castlemaine, Victoria
- Died: 17 June 1972; Canterbury, Victoria, Australia
- Education: Master of Law, Melbourne University Law School
- Occupations: Solicitor, Barrister, Magistrate
- Spouse: Sir George Oswald Reid (m. 1930)
- Children: 1 girl
- Parent(s): Lieutenant-General James Whiteside McCay and Julia Mary O'Meara

Beatrix Waring McCay, Lady Reid (8 January 1901 – 14 June 1972) was one of Victoria's earliest women barristers and magistrates. She was the second woman to sign the Victorian Bar and the first female 'Reader' of the Bar (reading with Robert Menzies).

Beatrix McCay was born at Castlemaine, Victoria, Australia, being the second daughter of Lieutenant-General Sir James Whiteside McCay and Julia Mary O'Meara. On 12 August 1930, aged 29, she married George Oswald Reid (later Sir George Oswald Reid), at St Patrick's Cathedral, Melbourne, and resided at Mont Albert, Victoria.

She entered the University of Melbourne studying law, and was a resident for four years at Janet Clarke Hall, which was at the time the women's section of Trinity College. She was secretary of the University Debating Society for two years, and a vice president for one year, and she was the only woman for a number of years on the committee of the Law Students' Society of Victoria. In 1925, McCay became only the third woman to obtain a Master of Laws from Melbourne Law School.

On 22 April, when residing at Brighton Road, St Kilda, she gave notice to sit at the Full Court to be Admitted to practise as a Barrister and Solicitor for the Board of Examiners for 1 June. She then became only the second woman—after Joan Rosanove—to sign the Victorian Bar Roll, doing so on 10 June 1925, and also becoming the first female 'Reader'.

She was actively involved in society at an early age helping the disadvantaged, such as donating her time at Yooralla kindergarten for children. In 1936, due to ill health, Beatrix became less active but maintained a role as a Special Magistrate for the Children's Court and Legal Women's Association – Vice President from 1936 and onward.

== External sources ==
A slideshow of the first women of the Victorian Bar including Beatrix McCay is available via the Victorian Bar, "Women Barristers in Victoria Then and Now ".
