= Béatrice Lalinon Gbado =

Beninese children's writer

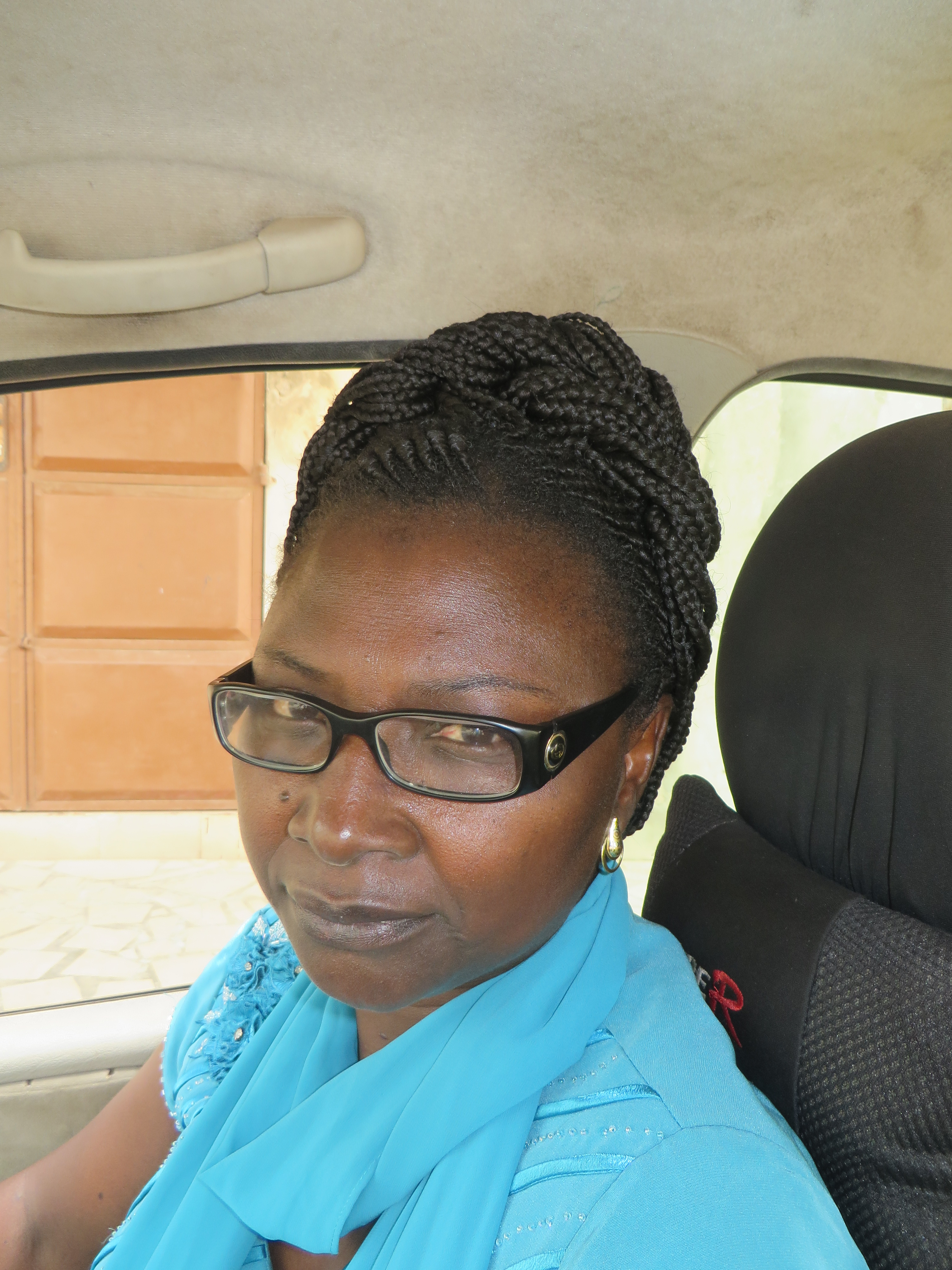
- Occupation: Children's writer
- Children: 4

Béatrice Lalinon Gbado is a children's writer from Benin.

She has written 31 children's books published by EDICEF, an imprint of the French publisher Hachette, and by her own publishing house Ruisseaux d'Afrique based in Cotonou. She is married and has four children.

== Publication ==
- Les fruits
- Les animaux domestiques
- Les légumes et condiments
- Les formes et les couleurs
- Nos instruments de musique
- Fleurs et papillons
- Les maisons de chez nous
- La cuisine de grand-mère
- La mère et l'enfant
- Ganvié
- Danse mon petit, danse
- Bovi, le petit cabri
- Bovi et le miroir
- Bovi sait compter
- Toutou et le sachet
- Kouaba, le village en sursis
- Le rêve de Siba
- Kaïvi, l’enfant placée
- La petite carpe dorée
- Le planteur et la bague
- Course à pirogue
- Kouaba, le village en sursis
- Le rêve de Siba
- Kaïvi, l’enfant placée
- La petite carpe dorée
- Le planteur et la bague
- Course à pirogue
- Le rat et le serpent
- Chevaux fabuleux
- La gifle
- Le nénuphar de Bola
- Mémé
- Hêdomey
- En marche vers la liberté Tomes1 et 2
- La belle Dêbo
- Les aventures de Biki

=== English translations ===
- Beautiful Debo: a story from Benin Translator Ponce E. Kokou Zannou, Africa Christian Press, 2001, ISBN 978-1-919876-13-9
