= Beatus of Lungern =

Swiss monk and hermit

Saint Beatus of Lungern
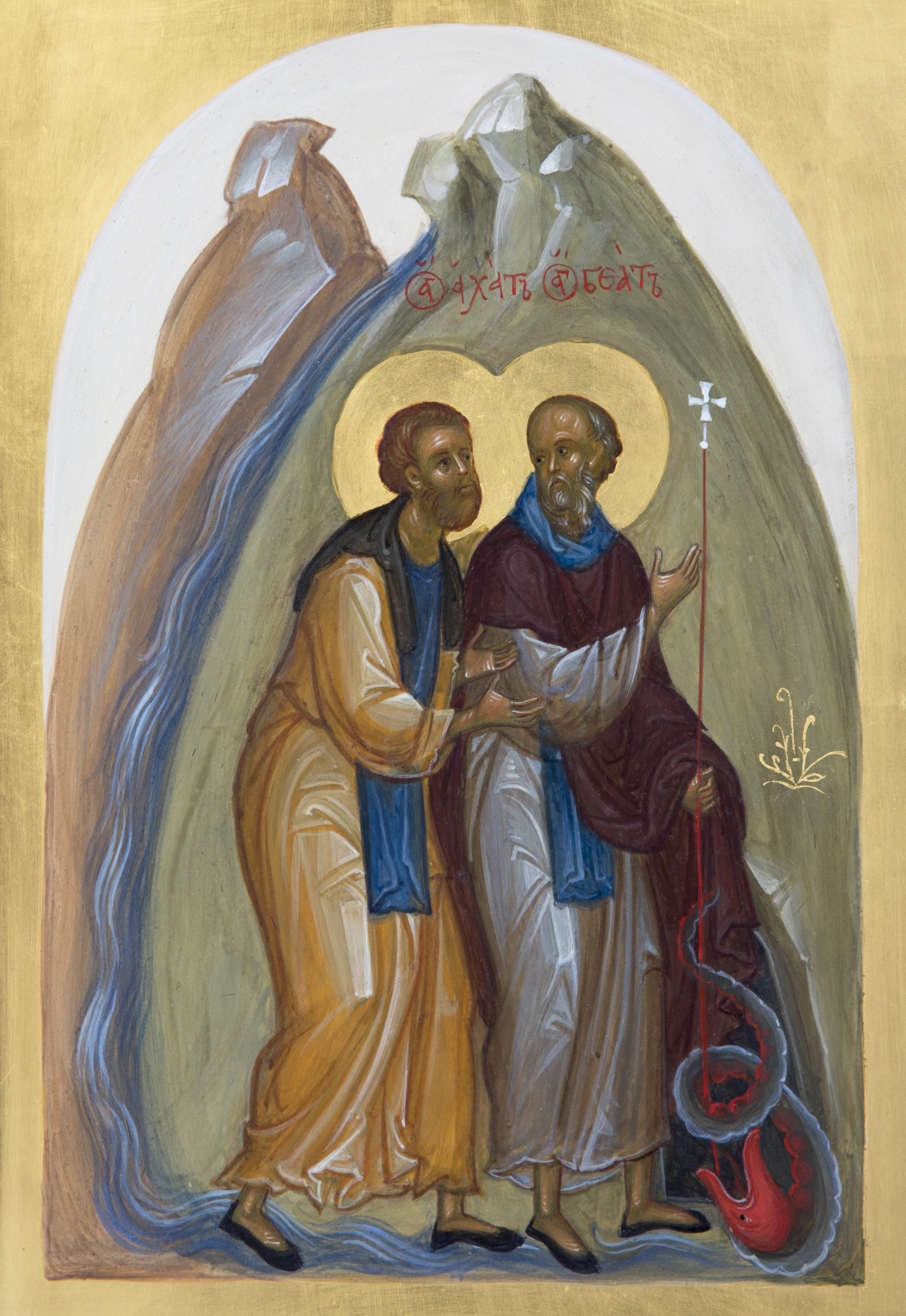
- Saint Beatus (right) depicted with Saint Achatus of Thun in a Russian Orthodox icon

Apostle of Switzerland Venerable Hermit
- Born: 1st century AD; Ireland or Scotland
- Died: c. 112; Mount Beatenberg, Switzerland
- Venerated in: Eastern Orthodox Church; Roman Catholic Church
- Feast: 9 May
- Attributes: As an old man reading in a mountain cave; a monk fighting a dragon

Saint Beatus of Lungern, also known as Beatus of Beatenberg or Beatus of Thun, was an early Christian monk and hermit who is venerated as a saint. Though his legend states that he died in the 2nd century, it is likely that his story has been conflated with other saints of the same name, especially Beatus of Vendôme, and an Abbot Beatus who received a charter in 810 from Charlemagne to confirm that Honau Abbey would be administered by Irish monks.

== Life ==
While legend claims that he was the son of a Scottish king, other legends place his birth in Ireland. Beatus was a convert, baptized in England by Saint Barnabas. He was allegedly ordained a priest in Rome by Saint Peter the Apostle, whereupon he was sent with a companion named Achates to evangelize the tribe of the Helvetii. The two set up a camp in Argovia near the Jura Mountains, where they converted many of the locals.

Beatus then ventured south to the mountains above Lake Thun, taking up a hermitage in what is now known as the Saint Beatus Caves (German: St. Beatus-Höhlen), near the village of Beatenberg, probably in the ninth century. Tradition states that this cave is where he fought a dragon. Saint Beatus' grave is located between the monastery and the cave entrance. He died at an old age in 112 CE.

== Monastery and caves ==
An Augustinian monastery was established near the mouth of the Saint Beatus Caves. Today, approximately 1 kilometre (0.62 mi) of the cave system has been opened and illuminated for tourist access; the monastery site now also houses a restaurant and gift shop for the convenience of tourists.

== Veneration ==
Beatus is primarily remembered as the first apostle to Switzerland. The cultus of Beatus was widespread in the Middle Ages and survived even the hostility of the Reformation period when pilgrims were driven back from his cave at spear-point by Zwinglian Protestants. After this period of turmoil, Beatus' relics, and the focus of his cultus, were transferred to the chapel at Lungern, Obwalden. The mountain where he resided until his death is still a place of pilgrimage, and bears his name: Beatenberg.

== Historicity ==
The coat of arms of Beatenberg, depicting Saint Beatus' fight with the dragon

The earliest recorded accounts of Saint Beatus' life date no earlier than the 10th and mid-11th centuries and have not been historically authenticated. So, some would hesitate to endorse the tradition that calls Saint Beatus the "Apostle of Switzerland". Indeed, Saint Gall probably more justly deserves this honor.

== Gallery ==
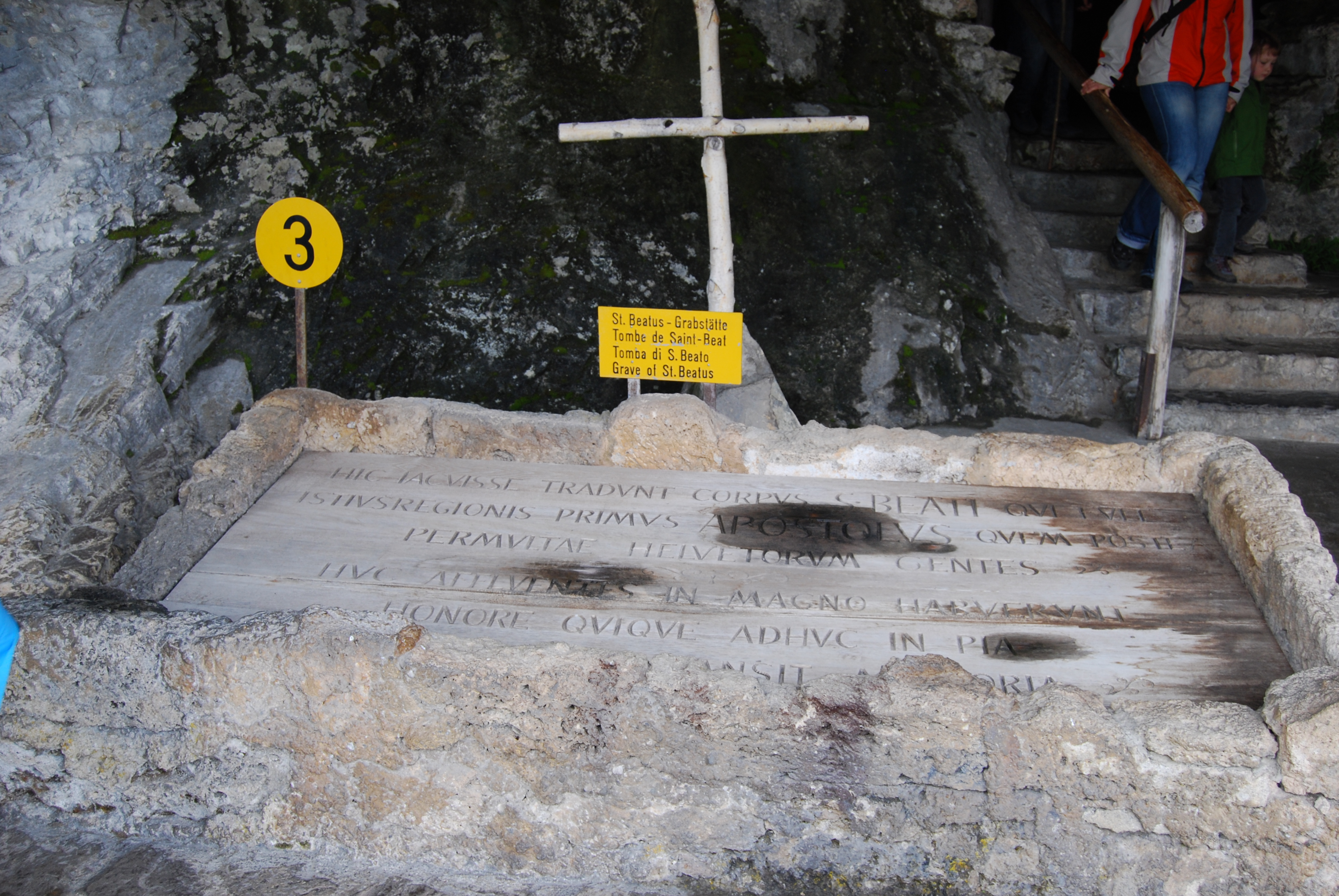
Grave of Saint Beatus at the entry to the Saint Beatus Caves, Beatenberg, Switzerland

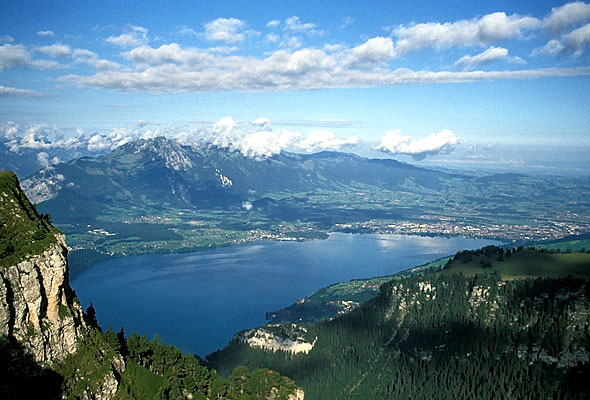
Lake Thun and the surrounding mountains, where legend contends that Beatus had his hermitage and fought a dragon

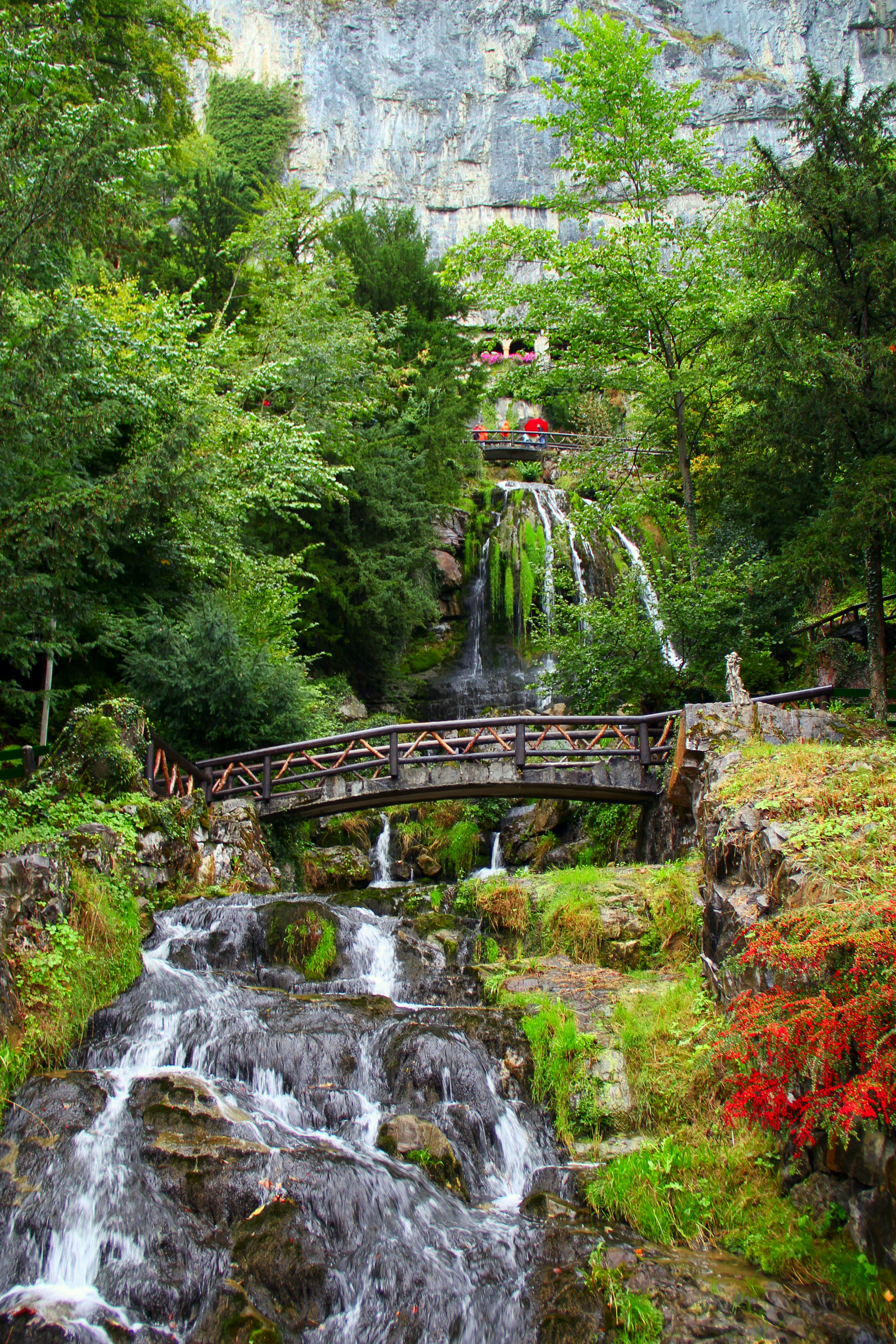
Monastery site from below

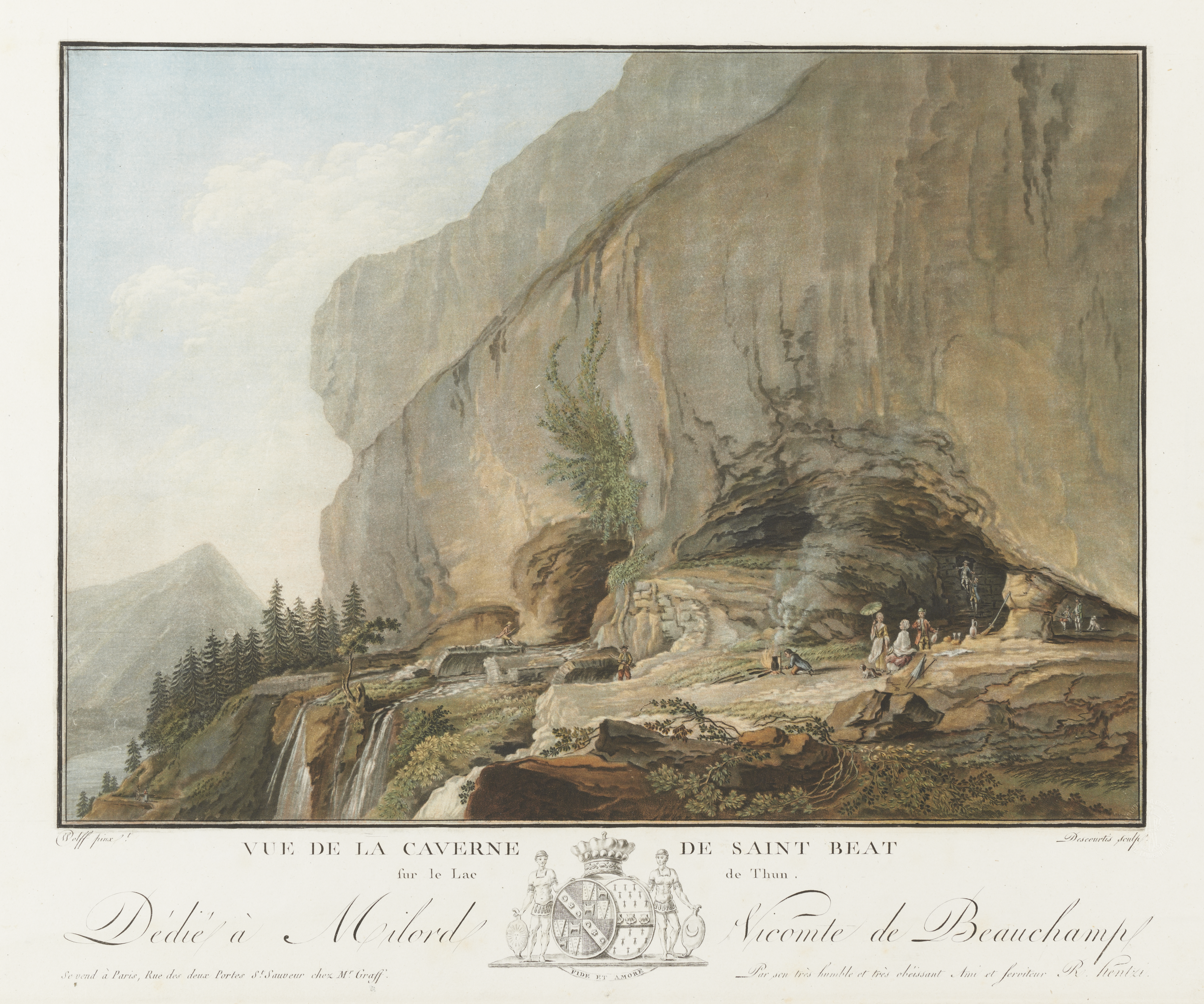
Saint Beatus Caves, 1785

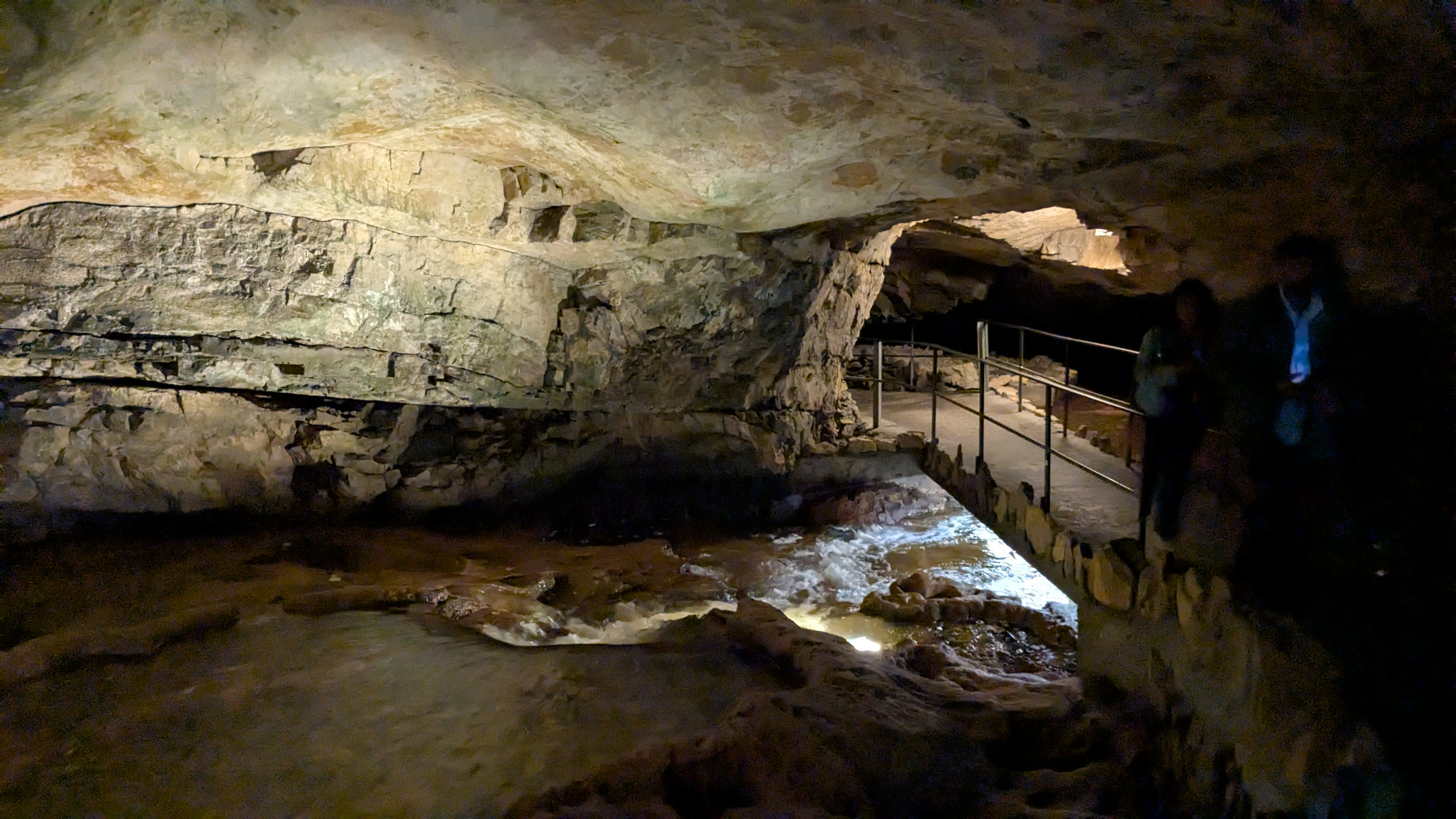
Saint Beatus Caves, 2025
