= Beatrice of Savoy (disambiguation) =

Beatrice of Savoy may refer to:

- Beatrice of Savoy, Marchioness of Saluzzo (c. 1223–1259)
- Beatrice of Savoy, Countess of Provence (c. 1198–1267)
- Beatrice of Savoy, Lady of Villena (1250–1292)
- Beatrice of Savoy, Dame of Faucigny (c. 1237–1310)
- Beatrice of Savoy (died 1331), wife of Duke Henry of Carinthia
