= Beatus =

Beatus, meaning "blessed" in medieval Latin, is a title for a person who has been beatified, the step before sainthood in the Catholic Church. It may also refer to:

== People ==
Ordered chronologically

- Beatus of Lungern (died 122), semi-legendary Christian monk, hermit and saint
- Beatus of Vendôme (died 3rd century), semi-legendary saint of Vendôme
- Beatus of Amiens, Bishop of Amiens c. 549
- Beatus (bishop of Passau), bishop from 746/747 to approximately 754
- Beatus of Liébana (c. 730–c. after 794), Spanish saint, monk and theologian
- Beatus (bishop of Urgell), bishop between 850 and 857
- Beatus Rhenanus (1485–1547), German humanist, religious reformer and classical scholar
- Beatus Christian Urassa (born 1965), Tanzanian Catholic bishop

== Other uses ==
- SS Beatus, a British cargo ship sunk by a U-boat in 1940
- Beatus United, original name of A.F.C. Porth, a Welsh football club
- "Beatus", a song from Imperfect Harmonies by Serj Tankian

== See also ==
- Beata (disambiguation)
- Beat (disambiguation)
