= Princess Beatrice (disambiguation) =

Princess Beatrice (born 1988) is the daughter of Andrew Mountbatten-Windsor and granddaughter of Queen Elizabeth II.

Princess Beatrice may also refer to:

== People ==
- Beatrice of England (1242–1275), daughter of Henry III of England and Eleanor of Provence, married John II of Brittany
- Princess Beatrice of the United Kingdom (1857–1944), youngest child of Queen Victoria and Prince Albert of Saxe-Coburg and Gotha
- Beatrice Bhadrayuvadi (1876–1913), daughter of King Chulalongkorn of Siam
- Princess Beatrice of Saxe-Coburg and Gotha (1884–1966), youngest daughter of Alfred I, Duke of Saxe-Coburg and Gotha, and Grand Duchess Maria Alexandrovna of Russia
- Princess Béatrice of Bourbon-Two Sicilies (born 1950), eldest child of Prince Ferdinand, Duke of Castro, and Chantal de Chevron-Villette

== Other uses ==
- Beatrice, a MR 1738 Class locomotive built in 1885 for the Midland Railway and named after Princess Beatrice, who opened the Royal Jubilee Saltaire Exhibition of 1887 where the locomotive won a gold medal
- Princess Beatrice, a GWR 3031 Class locomotive built in 1899 for the Great Western Railway
- PS Princess Beatrice, a ferry
- SS Princess Beatrice, a steamship that operated on the coast of British Columbia
