= Beatrice of Portugal (disambiguation) =

Beatrice of Portugal (1373–c. 1420) was the daughter of Ferdinand I of Portugal, and Queen of Castile by marriage to John I of Castile. She was also queen regnant or claimant to the throne of Portugal.

Beatrice of Portugal may also refer to:

- Beatrice of Portugal, Countess of Alburquerque (died in 1382), daughter of Peter I of Portugal and Inês de Castro, married to Sancho Alfonso
- Beatrice, Countess of Arundel (c. 1386–1439), natural daughter of John I of Portugal and Inês Pires.
- Infanta Beatrice, Duchess of Viseu (1430–1506), mother of King Manuel I of Portugal
- Beatrice of Portugal, Duchess of Savoy (1504–1538), daughter of Manuel I of Portugal and Maria of Aragon, and married to Charles III, Duke of Savoy
- Infanta Beatriz of Portugal (1530), daughter of John III of Portugal
