= Beata =

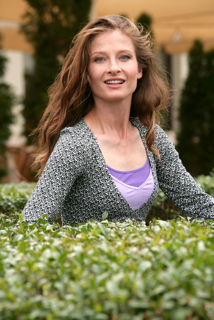
- Beata Poźniak
- Pronunciation: Bee-tah; Beh-tah
- Gender: Female
- Name day: 9th May (Croatia); 8th March (Denmark, Lithuania and Poland); 2nd December (Sweden)

Other gender
- Masculine: Beat

Origin
- Language: Latin
- Meaning: Blessed

Other names
- Alternative spelling: Beate, Beade, Beáta
- Derivative: From Latin "beatus"
- Usage: Eastern Europe, Central Europe
- Related names: Beatrix, Beatrice, Beatriz

Beata or Beate is a female given name or Portuguese surname that occurs in several cultures and languages, including Italian, German, Polish, and Swedish, and which is derived from the Latin beatus, meaning "blessed". Variants include Bea, Beade and Beáta. The name may refer to:

- Beata Asimakopoulou (1932–2009), Greek actress
- Beate Bille, (born 1976), Danish actress
- Beata Brookes (1930–2015), British politician
- Beata Bublewicz (born 1975), Polish politician
- Beate Bühler (born 1964), German volleyball player
- Beata Gosiewska (born 1971), Polish politician
- Beata Harju (born 1990), Finnish actress and filmmaker
- Beate Heister (born 1951), German billionaire
- Beata Kaczmarska (born 1970), Polish race walker
- Beata Kitsikis (1907–1986), Greek politician
- Beate Klarsfeld (born 1939), German Nazi hunter
- Beata Kollmats (born 1992), Swedish footballer
- Beata Kozidrak (born 1960), Polish singer
- Beata Losman (born 1938), Swedish archivist
- Beate Meißner (born 1982), German politician
- Beata Mikołajczyk (born 1985), Polish sprint canoer
- Beate von Miquel (born 1968), German academic
- Beata Obertyńska (1898–1980), Polish writer
- Beata Papp (born 1985), Finnish figure skater
- Beata Pozniak (born 1960), Polish actress
- Beata Rosenhane (1638–1674), Swedish writer
- Beate Sirota (1923–2012), American performing arts presenter
- Beata Sokołowska-Kulesza (born 1974), Polish sprint canoer
- Beata Sabina Straas (died 1773), Swedish actress
- Beata Szydło (born 1963), Polish politician and prime minister
- Beata Tyszkiewicz (born 1938), Polish actress
- Beate Uhse-Rotermund (1919–2001), German pilot and entrepreneur
- Beata von Yxkull (1616–1667), Swedish noble and folklore character
- Beate Zschäpe (born 1975), German convicted neo-Nazi terrorist

== See also ==
- Beat (male given name)
- Beatus (male given name)
