= Beatrice of Ornacieux =

Blessed Beatrice of Ornacieux
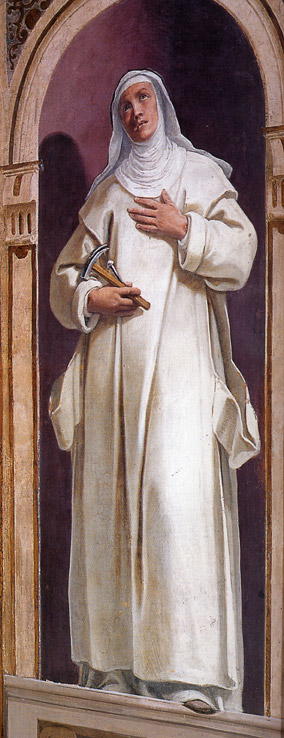
- Painting from Garegnano Charterhouse in Milan, by Daniele Crespi
- Born: 13th Century
- Died: 1306 or 1309
- Venerated in: Roman Catholic Church
- Beatified: 1869 by Pope Pius IX
- Feast: 25 November

Blessed Beatrix d'Ornacieux (Beatrice of Ornacieux) (c. 1240–1306/09) was a Carthusian nun. Her feast day is 25 November.

Beatrice was a Carthusian nun who founded a settlement of the order at Eymieux in the department of Drôme. According to her Vita, written by Marguerite of Oingt, she was especially devoted to the Passion of Christ and is said to have driven a nail through her left hand to help herself to realize the sufferings of the Crucifixion.

Her cultus was confirmed by Pius IX in 1869. (See "Anal. jur. pont.", 1869, XI, 264.) There are modern lives by Bellanger and Chapuis and a full account in Lecoulteux, "Ann. Ord. Cath." (V, 5). Her feast is on 25 November according to the current Carthusian Calendar.
