= Basis function =

Element of a basis for a function space

In mathematics, a basis function is an element of a particular basis for a function space. Every function in the function space can be represented as a linear combination of basis functions. In finite-dimensional vector spaces, this representation is purely algebraic and involves only finitely many basis functions, whereas in infinite-dimensional settings it may take the form of an infinite series or another limiting process whose convergence depends on the topology of the space.

The choice of basis functions is not unique. Different bases can represent the same function space, but can have different properties that are useful for particular applications. For example, monomials are convenient for elementary polynomial calculations, trigonometric functions are useful for Fourier analysis, and locally supported functions are useful in numerical methods.

In numerical analysis and approximation theory, basis functions are also called blending functions, particularly in applications such as interpolation. In this application, a mixture of the basis functions provides an interpolating function, with the coefficients determined by the data being interpolated. Basis functions are also used extensively in finite element methods, splines, wavelets, and other approximation methods.

== Examples ==
=== Monomial basis for analytic functions ===
The monomial functions

$$\{x^n\mid n\in\mathbb{N}\}$$

are the functions used in power-series representations of analytic functions. A function analytic in a neighbourhood of zero can be represented by a Taylor series

$$f(x)=\sum_{n=0}^{\infty}a_nx^n.$$

The coefficients are given by

$$a_n=\frac{f^{(n)}(0)}{n!}.$$

Thus the monomials are the basis functions in the power-series representation. In this infinite-dimensional setting, however, this should not be confused with a Hamel basis, since a Hamel-basis expansion uses only finitely many basis elements. The appropriate notion of basis depends on the topology and structure imposed on the function space.

More generally, a Taylor series about a point a uses the basis functions

$$(x-a)^n.$$

The use of monomials as basis functions is therefore closely associated with Taylor series and polynomial approximation.

=== Monomial basis for polynomials ===
The monomial basis forms a basis for the vector space of polynomials of bounded degree. For the vector space of polynomials of degree at most n, a standard basis is

$$\{1,x,x^2,\ldots,x^n\}.$$

Every polynomial in this space can be written as

$$p(x)=a_0+a_1x+a_2x^2+\cdots+a_nx^n$$

for some coefficients a_{0}, a_{1}, …, a_{n}. It is therefore a linear combination of the monomial basis functions.

The monomial basis is only one possible basis for this space. Other commonly used polynomial bases include the Bernstein polynomials, Chebyshev polynomials, and Legendre polynomials. Different polynomial bases can have different numerical properties, particularly when the degree is large.

=== Lagrange basis functions ===
Basis functions can be chosen to correspond directly to interpolation points. Suppose that n + 1 distinct points

$$x_0,x_1,\ldots,x_n$$

are given. The Lagrange basis functions are

$$\ell_i(x)=\prod_{j=0,\ j\ne i}^{n}\frac{x-x_j}{x_i-x_j},$$

for i = 0, …, n.

Each basis function has the cardinal property

$$\ell_i(x_j)=\delta_{ij},$$

where δ_{ij} is the Kronecker delta. Thus ℓ_{i} is equal to 1 at its associated interpolation point and 0 at all the other interpolation points.

If the corresponding data values are y_{0}, …, y_{n}, the unique polynomial of degree at most n passing through the data points is

$$p(x)=\sum_{i=0}^{n}y_i\ell_i(x).$$

The functions ℓ_{i} are therefore basis functions for the space of polynomials of degree at most n. Their cardinal property also makes the coefficients of the interpolation polynomial equal to the prescribed values at the interpolation points. Lagrange basis functions are used in polynomial interpolation and in the construction of Lagrange finite elements."Lagrange Interpolating Polynomial". MathWorld. Wolfram Research."Interpolation formula". Encyclopedia of Mathematics.

=== Fourier basis for L^{2}[0,1] ===
Sines and cosines form an orthonormal basis for square-integrable functions on a bounded interval. For the interval [0,1], one such basis is the collection

$$\{1\}\cup
\{\sqrt{2}\sin(2\pi n x)\mid n\in\mathbb{N},\ n\geq1\}
\cup
\{\sqrt{2}\cos(2\pi n x)\mid n\in\mathbb{N},\ n\geq1\}.$$

This is an orthonormal basis for L^{2}[0,1]. A function f in this space can be represented, with convergence in the L^{2} sense, by

$$f(x)=a_0+\sum_{n=1}^{\infty}
\left(
a_n\sqrt{2}\cos(2\pi n x)
+b_n\sqrt{2}\sin(2\pi n x)
\right).$$

The coefficients are obtained from inner products with the corresponding basis functions. This gives the usual Fourier series representation.

In an infinite-dimensional space such as L^{2}[0,1], the word "basis" refers to a topological basis in this context rather than a Hamel basis. In particular, the expansion generally contains infinitely many nonzero terms.

=== Orthogonal polynomial basis ===
Polynomial spaces can also be represented using orthogonal polynomial bases. If a sequence of polynomials is orthogonal with respect to an inner product, the coefficients of an expansion can be obtained by taking inner products with the corresponding basis functions.

Important examples include Legendre polynomials, Chebyshev polynomials, and Hermite polynomials. Such bases are used in approximation theory, numerical integration, spectral methods, and the solution of differential equations.

For an orthogonal basis {φ_{i}}, the coefficient in an expansion

$$f=\sum_i c_i\phi_i$$

can be calculated, when the required inner products exist, from

$$c_i=\frac{\langle f,\phi_i\rangle}{\langle\phi_i,\phi_i\rangle}.$$

For an orthonormal basis the denominator is 1.

=== Spline basis functions ===
Spline spaces are commonly represented by basis functions with local support. A function in a spline space can be written as a linear combination of basis functions, with each basis function nonzero only on part of the domain.

B-spline basis functions are a standard example. A spline of degree p can be written in the form

$$S(x)=\sum_i c_iN_{i,p}(x),$$

where N_{i,p} are B-spline basis functions and c_{i} are coefficients.

Local support is useful in numerical computation because changing one coefficient affects only the part of the spline on which the corresponding basis function is nonzero.

=== Finite element basis functions ===
In the finite element method, a finite-dimensional function space is used to approximate the solution of a problem, often a partial differential equation. An approximate function is written as a linear combination of basis functions,

$$u_h(x)=\sum_{i=1}^{N}c_i\phi_i(x).$$

The basis functions are usually associated with nodes, edges, faces, or other degrees of freedom of the finite-element mesh. Many commonly used finite elements have basis functions with local support. For nodal finite elements, the basis functions often satisfy

$$\phi_i(x_j)=\delta_{ij}.$$

Linear and higher-degree Lagrange finite elements use polynomial basis functions. Other finite elements use different types of basis functions and degrees of freedom. Local basis functions contribute to the sparsity of the matrices arising from finite element discretizations."Construction of scalar and vector finite element families on polygonal and polyhedral meshes". PMC.

=== Radial basis functions ===
A radial basis function depends on the distance from a specified centre. A radial basis function centred at x_{i} has the form

$$\phi_i(x)=\phi(\lVert x-x_i\rVert).$$

An approximation using radial basis functions can therefore be written as

$$f(x)=\sum_{i=1}^{N}c_i\phi(\lVert x-x_i\rVert).$$

Radial basis functions are used in interpolation, approximation theory, numerical methods, and other applications.

=== Wavelet basis functions ===
Wavelet systems provide basis functions that are localized in position and scale. A wavelet system is commonly constructed from dilations and translations of a mother wavelet. A typical family has the form

$$\psi_{j,k}(x)=2^{j/2}\psi(2^jx-k),$$

where j specifies the scale and k specifies the translation.

Depending on the construction, a wavelet system can be an orthogonal basis, a biorthogonal basis, or another type of basis. Wavelet bases are used in signal processing, image processing, numerical analysis, and harmonic analysis.

== Properties and choice of basis ==
A function space can have many different bases. The choice of basis does not change the underlying space, but it changes the representation of its elements.

For a finite-dimensional space, a basis must be linearly independent and span the space. Every element then has a unique finite linear combination of basis functions.

In an infinite-dimensional space, several different notions of basis are used. A Hamel basis still gives finite linear combinations, but a Schauder basis represents elements by convergent series. In a Hilbert space, an orthonormal basis provides an expansion in which the coefficients are given by inner products. These notions should not be treated as interchangeable.

The choice of basis can also affect numerical calculations. A basis may be selected because its functions are easy to evaluate, have local support, are orthogonal, satisfy interpolation conditions, or give a well-conditioned numerical problem.

For example, the monomial basis is simple but can have poor numerical properties for high-degree polynomial calculations. Other polynomial bases can be preferable for approximation and numerical computation. In finite element methods, local support is particularly useful because it produces sparse systems."Approximation of functions, linear methods". Encyclopedia of Mathematics.

== See also ==
- Basis (linear algebra) (Hamel basis)
- Schauder basis
- Dual basis
- Biorthogonal system (Markushevich basis)
- Orthonormal basis
- Orthogonal polynomials
- Fourier analysis
- Fourier series
- Harmonic analysis
- Orthogonal wavelet
- Biorthogonal wavelet
- Radial basis function
- Finite element method
- Functional analysis
- Approximation theory
- Numerical analysis
- Interpolation
