= 2001 Tenneco Automotive Grand Prix of Detroit =

Motor race held in Belle Isle Park, Michigan

Coordinates: 42°20′10″N 82°59′44″W

(United States) 2001 Tenneco Automotive Grand Prix of Detroit
Race details
- Race 7 of 21 in the 2001 CART season
- Map of the Raceway at Belle Isle
- Date: June 17, 2001
- Official name: Tenneco Automotive Grand Prix of Detroit
- Location: Raceway at Belle Isle; Belle Isle Park, Michigan, United States
- Course: Temporary street circuit 2.346 mi / 3.776 km
- Distance: 72 laps 168.912 mi / 271.838 km
- Weather: Warm, sunny

Pole position
- Driver: (Brazil) Hélio Castroneves (Team Penske)
- Time: 1:13.499

Fastest lap
- Driver: (United States) Michael Andretti (Team Motorola)
- Time: 1:16.010 (on lap 71 of 72)

Podium
- First: (Brazil) Hélio Castroneves (Team Penske)
- Second: (United Kingdom) Dario Franchitti (Team Green)
- Third: (Brazil) Roberto Moreno (Patrick Racing)

The 2001 Tenneco Automotive Grand Prix of Detroit was a Championship Auto Racing Teams (CART) motor race held on June 17, 2001 at the Raceway at Belle Isle in Belle Isle Park, Michigan before 40,000 spectators. It was the seventh round of the 2001 CART FedEx Championship Series and the 20th running of the event (13th as a CART race). The 72-lap race was won by Team Penske driver Hélio Castroneves. Dario Franchitti finished second for Team Green, and Patrick Racing's Roberto Moreno clinched third.

The beginning of the race weekend was shrouded in controversy when CART introduced a spacer for the cars' engines two days before the race after Toyota accused Honda and Ford-Cosworth of applying less pressure on their pop-off valve to gain more turbocharger boost. Feeling that the spacer was implemented too suddenly to assess its ability, Honda and Ford-Cosworth's teams boycotted the first practice session, though both engine manufacturers eventually relented. The matter was not resolved until July 16, with all three manufacturers agreeing to use the spacer beginning in the Michigan 500.

Castroneves set the fastest lap time of qualifying and earned the pole position. He was initially challenged for the lead by Bruno Junqueira before his gearbox failed on lap 29. Junqueira was one of several drivers who experienced a mechanical issue or crashed out of the race because of the track's bumpy and deteriorating surface, notably in turn 12. Franchitti made an aggressive overtake on Patrick Carpentier for second place on the 66th lap, but never outpaced Castroneves, who earned his second win in Detroit and his fifth CART victory.

There were four caution flags and no lead changes during the course of the race. Because of his win, Castroneves shortened Kenny Bräck's lead in the Drivers' Championship, while Michael Andretti advanced from seventh to third. Reynard took the Constructors' Cup lead from Lola, and Honda widened their gap over Toyota in the Manufacturers' Cup standings with 14 races remaining in the season. The Detroit Grand Prix was dropped from CART's schedule after 2001 and became an IndyCar Series event in 2007.

== Background ==
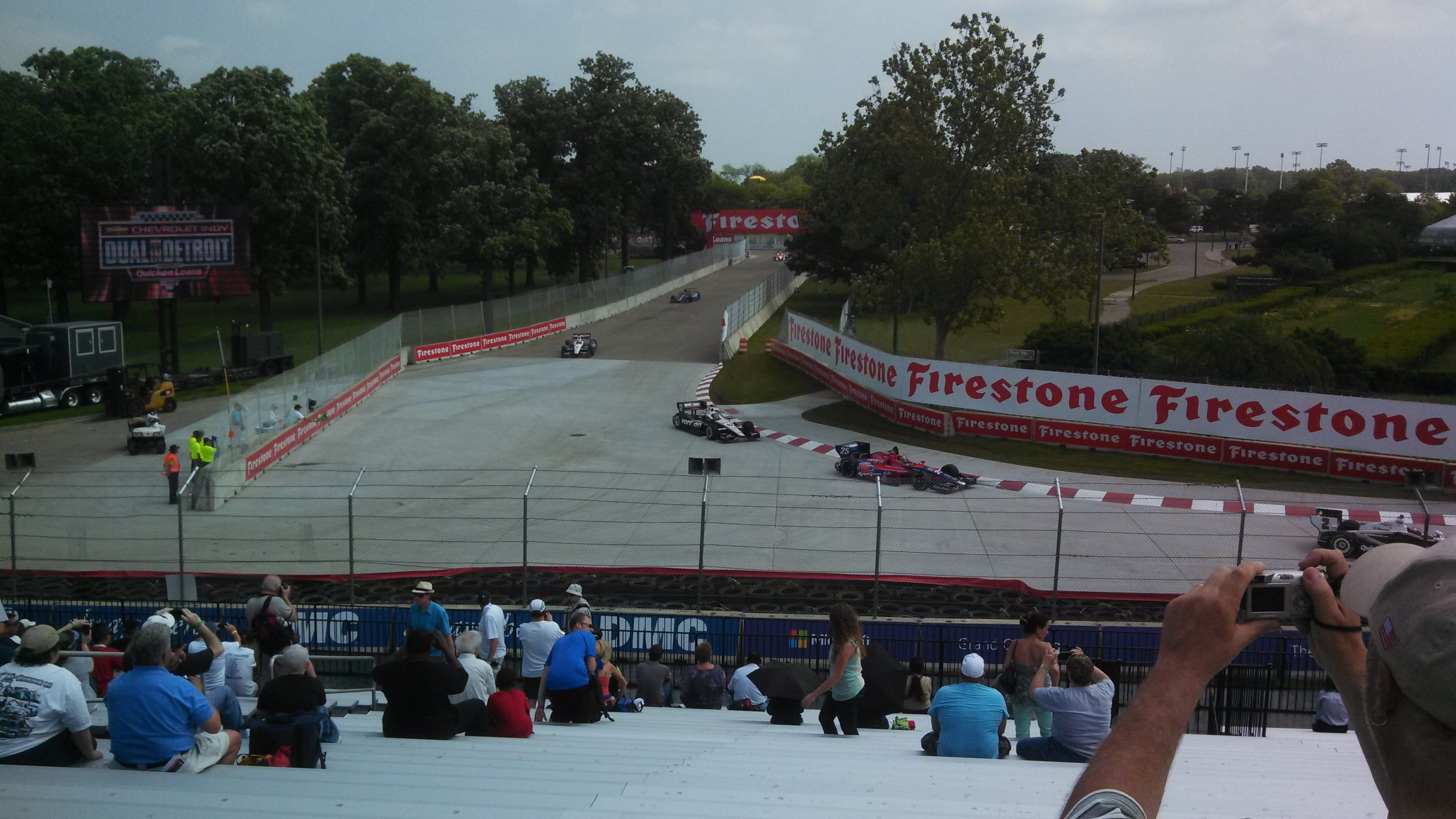
The Raceway at Belle Isle (pictured in 2013), where the race was held.

The 2001 Tenneco Automotive Grand Prix of Detroit was the seventh of 21 scheduled open-wheel races in Championship Auto Racing Teams (CART)'s 2001 FedEx Championship Series. The race was confirmed to be included on the series' schedule in June 2000, despite a report from The Indianapolis Star claiming otherwise. It was the 20th annual edition of the event and the 13th under CART sanctioning; the race was previously part of the Formula One World Championship from 1982 to 1988. It was held on the Raceway at Belle Isle, a 14-turn, 2.346 mi (3.776 km) street circuit, in Belle Isle Park, Michigan, United States for the tenth successive year on Sunday, June 17, 2001.

Heading into the race, Kenny Bräck led the Drivers' Championship with 70 points, 23 more than second-place Hélio Castroneves. Cristiano da Matta, Paul Tracy, and Jimmy Vasser were all tied for third place with 40 points each. The Constructors' Cup standings were led by Lola with 98 points, while Reynard trailed by six points. As for the Manufacturers' Cup, Honda was first in the standings with 86 points; Toyota was two points behind in second, and third-place Ford-Cosworth was 13 points in arrears.

The positive momentum that Castroneves built at the beginning of the season, with wins in the Grand Prix of Long Beach and the Indy Racing League (IRL)-sanctioned Indianapolis 500, was derailed when he crashed on the first lap of the preceding Miller Lite 225 at the Milwaukee Mile. This, coupled with Bräck's two consecutive wins at Motegi and Milwaukee, allowed Bräck to dramatically widen his gap over Castroneves. Despite this, Castroneves expressed anticipation for the Grand Prix of Detroit, as he earned his first CART win in the race the year prior: "I hope to climb the fence again, since that is where the tradition started! Marlboro Team Penske is looking forward to returning to Detroit and trying to repeat what we did last year." Bräck said that he was focused on future races rather than dwelling on his past success to maintain his team's "good energy".

2001 was the last year of CART's contract with International Management Group (IMG), the Detroit Grand Prix promoter, and the future of the event was in serious doubt. The Belle Isle circuit was considered by fans to be the worst track on CART's schedule because very little passing occurred. Since a record-high 62,000 fans attended the race in 1994, the event's attendance rates experienced a steady decline. The drivers and teams also disliked the circuit because the paddock area was cramped and the track was too narrow. IMG president Bud Stanner explained that his company was struggling to afford hosting the event and paying CART, and revealed that a possible move to the Michigan State Fairgrounds Speedway was being considered in order to preserve CART's presence in Detroit.

== Practice ==
=== Friday, June 15 ===
==== Honda and Ford-Cosworth boycott ====
In the lead-up to the Detroit Grand Prix, Toyota complained to CART that they were at a competitive disadvantage because a Toyota employee who previously worked for Honda revealed that Honda and Ford-Cosworth were both exploiting a loophole in the series' rules which allowed them to lower the pressure of the pop-off valve and gain more turbocharger boost. To negate Honda and Ford-Cosworth's advantage, CART implemented a 3/4 in (19 mm) spacer extension to the base of the manifold pressure relief valve. The spacer had previously been used in a test conducted at Michigan International Speedway on June 12 which aimed to reduce speeds on the superspeedways with an altered Handford device. During the test, CART stated that all three engine manufacturers were made aware that the spacer would be introduced at the Grand Prix of Detroit. However, Honda and Ford-Cosworth claimed in separate press releases that they were only informed of the decision when CART issued a bulletin on Friday morning, prior to the first practice session.

Taken aback by the rule change, Honda and Ford-Cosworth ordered the teams that used their engines to boycott the session while their representatives met with CART officials to resolve the issue. Both manufacturers explained that even the smallest mechanical changes can greatly affect an engine's performance. Toyota's teams did not take part in the boycott because they had already tested the spacer at a road course, the Mid-Ohio Sports Car Course, on June 13. This led to rumors that Toyota had created and assessed the spacer long before the Michigan and Mid-Ohio tests, which Toyota swiftly denied. Ford-Cosworth eventually relented and allowed their teams to practice with 15 minutes remaining in the session, whereas Honda drivers never took to the track. The 90-minute session, which was delayed by 15 minutes because of an oil spray left by a car in a support race, was led by Vasser with a lap time of 1 minute and 16.305 seconds. Christian Fittipaldi, da Matta, Roberto Moreno, and Maurício Gugelmin were second- through fifth-quickest. Dario Franchitti prompted the only stoppage of the session when he slammed into a tire barrier with the left side of his car in turn 12.

The second practice session on Friday afternoon also lasted 90 minutes. Honda advised their teams to sit out the session, but permitted them to practice if they so desired, which all of them eventually did. Ford-Cosworth also allowed their drivers to partake in the session because they did not want to disappoint Ford's supporters at their home race. The session was held under humid conditions, and many teams struggled to find an ideal racing setup. Franchitti was the quickest driver at 1 minute and 14.838 seconds, besting the times of Patrick Carpentier, Bruno Junqueira, Gugelmin, and Castroneves. The red flag was issued three times: the first was for a dislodged manhole cover that spread debris on-track, the second was for Kanaan spinning into a tire barrier in turn three, and the third was for Castroneves losing control of his car at the same corner.

==== Failed Honda protest ====
On Friday evening, Honda and three of their teams filed a protest against CART to cancel the Detroit Grand Prix because of the sudden implementation of the spacer. Honda Performance Development (HPD) general manager Robert Clarke said of the protest: "If CART gets away with this, the series will be run on a 'rule du jour' basis. Who's to say when we show up at Portland it won't be something else different, a one inch spacer, let's say." A three-man judicial panel heard and denied the protest because, according to CART, "the judges concluded that there was no basis under the rules for granting HPD's protest". HPD was permitted to appeal the denied protest within three business days.

=== Saturday, June 16 ===
The third and final practice session on Saturday morning was 75 minutes long and ran without any boycotts from Honda or Ford-Cosworth. Gil de Ferran was fastest in the session with a 1 minute, 14.043 second-lap; his Team Penske teammate Castroneves, Franchitti, Fittipaldi, and Moreno rounded out the session's top five drivers. Fittipaldi caused the first of three stoppages in the session when he spun and stalled his engine in turn 11. Franchitti later skidded into a tire wall in turn 12 with the left side of his car. Finally, Michel Jourdain Jr. spun out and stalled in the 11th turn.

== Qualifying ==
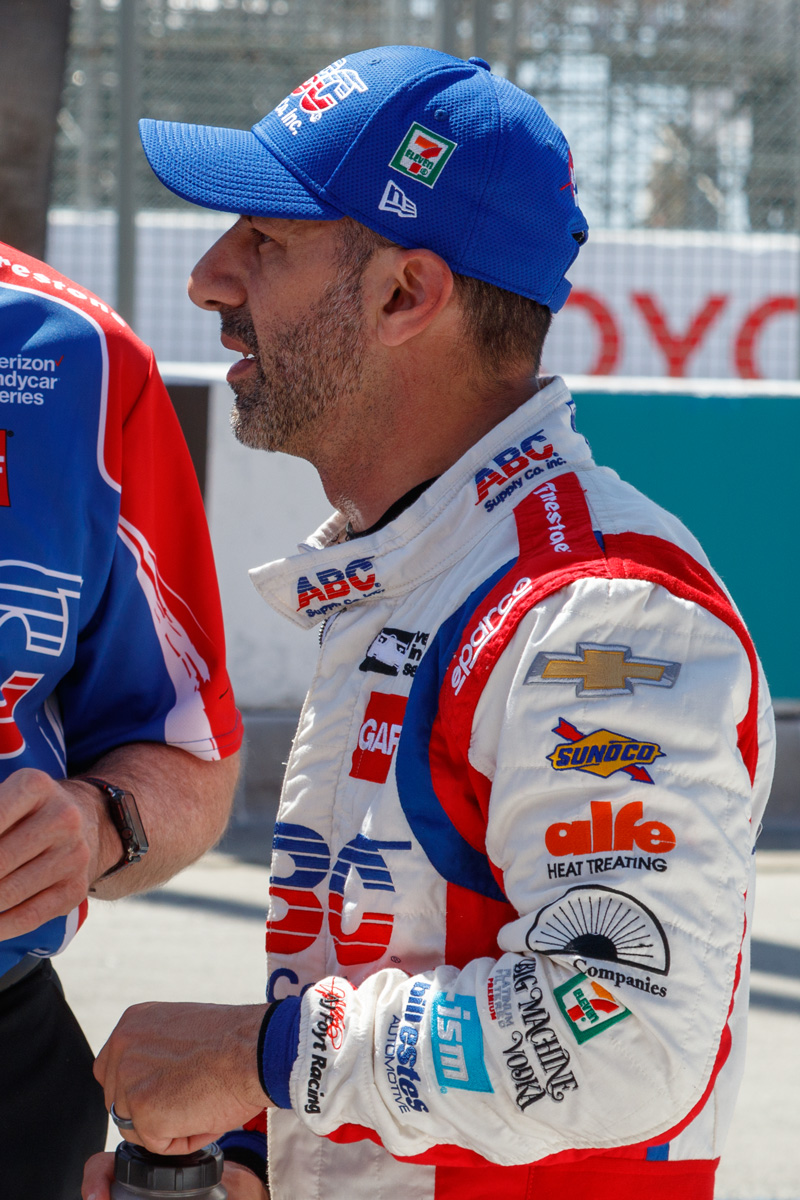
Tony Kanaan (pictured in 2018) suffered a concussion in a qualifying crash and withdrew from the race.

The qualifying session was held for 75 minutes on Saturday afternoon, two and a half hours after the final practice session ended. During qualifications, the 26 drivers were split into two groups, with the leading drivers in the championship standings and the fastest two qualifiers of the previous road course race being placed in the second group. Each group was allotted 30 minutes of track time, with a 15-minute interval separating the two groups. The humidity of Friday's practice sessions had slightly decreased by the time the qualifying session began. With a time of 1 minute and 13.499 seconds that recorded on his last lap, Castroneves earned his third pole position of the season and the seventh of his career. Junqueira trailed Castroneves by 0.082 seconds and joined him on the grid's front row, splitting the Team Penske pair and relegating de Ferran to third place. After qualifying, de Ferran stated that his Honda engine's performance had improved from Friday, but was still flawed. Patrick Racing drivers Vasser and Moreno respectively took fifth and seventh place, the best qualifying result for the team in the season thus far, only being separated by sixth-placed Carpentier, who was the fastest of the Ford-Cosworth drivers. Fittipaldi did not record a lap time in the final 76 seconds of the session due to a problem with his car, but still started in eighth. Behind Shinji Nakano in ninth, Bräck was 10th because of a car which he said was understeering and oversteering.

Oriol Servià, Gugelmin, and Michael Andretti assumed the next three positions. Nicolas Minassian, 14th, spun at the sixth turn. Adrián Fernández started 15th, ahead of 16th-place Alex Zanardi, who spun his car while exiting turn six. The next three drivers behind Zanardi were Cristiano da Matta, Scott Dixon, and Jourdain. 20th place starter Alex Tagliani brushed a wall in turn 12 and slammed into an outside tire barrier at the exit of the next corner; the resulting red flag from the crash prevented Carpentier, Servià, and Zanardi from recording faster lap times. Max Wilson took 21st and Bryan Herta started 22nd. Tracy hit the inside wall at the exit of turn 13 and damaged his right-rear tire. In his backup car, he applied his brakes too hard and spun backwards into a tire wall in the third corner. He wound up starting 23rd, ahead of Max Papis, in 24th, and Tora Takagi, in 25th. Tony Kanaan made contact with Papis and slammed a wall in the tenth turn with the nose of his car. He then posted the slowest time of the session with his backup car. Following the session, Kanaan complained of headaches to the CART medical staff and was sent to the Detroit Receiving Hospital for a CAT scan. The results of the scan were negative, but doctors diagnosed Kanaan with a mild concussion and advised him not to compete in the race. As a result, Mo Nunn Racing withdrew his No. 55 car.

=== Qualifying classification ===
Final qualifying results
Pos	No.	Driver	Team	Time	Speed	Grid
1	3	(Brazil) Hélio Castroneves	Team Penske	1:13.499	114.908	1
2	4	(Brazil) Bruno Junqueira	Chip Ganassi Racing	1:13.581	114.780	2
3	1	(Brazil) Gil de Ferran	Team Penske	1:13.666	114.647	3
4	27	(United Kingdom) Dario Franchitti	Team Green	1:14.024	114.093	4
5	40	(United States) Jimmy Vasser	Patrick Racing	1:14.066	114.028	5
6	32	(Canada) Patrick Carpentier	Forsythe Championship Racing	1:14.181	113.851	6
7	20	(Brazil) Roberto Moreno	Patrick Racing	1:14.284	113.693	7
8	11	(Brazil) Christian Fittipaldi	Newman/Haas Racing	1:14.293	113.680	8
9	52	(Japan) Shinji Nakano	Fernández Racing	1:14.500	113.364	9
10	8	(Sweden) Kenny Bräck	Team Rahal	1:14.699	113.062	10
11	22	(Spain) Oriol Servià	Sigma Autosport	1:14.705	113.053	11
12	17	(Brazil) Maurício Gugelmin	PacWest Racing	1:14.828	112.867	12
13	39	(United States) Michael Andretti	Team Motorola	1:14.963	112.664	13
14	12	(France) Nicolas Minassian	Chip Ganassi Racing	1:14.964	112.662	14
15	51	(Mexico) Adrian Fernández	Fernández Racing	1:15.004	112.602	15
16	66	(Italy) Alex Zanardi	Mo Nunn Racing	1:15.059	112.519	16
17	6	(Brazil) Cristiano da Matta	Newman/Haas Racing	1:15.074	112.497	17
18	18	(New Zealand) Scott Dixon	PacWest Racing	1:15.126	112.419	18
19	16	(Mexico) Michel Jourdain Jr.	Bettenhausen Racing	1:15.128	112.416	19
20	33	(Canada) Alex Tagliani	Forsythe Championship Racing	1:15.243	112.244	20
21	25	(Brazil) Max Wilson	Arciero-Brooke Racing	1:15.300	112.159	21
22	77	(United States) Bryan Herta	Forsythe Championship Racing	1:15.318	112.133	22
23	26	(Canada) Paul Tracy	Team Green	1:15.538	111.806	23
24	7	(Italy) Max Papis	Team Rahal	1:16.551	110.326	24
25	5	(Japan) Toranosuke Takagi	Walker Racing	1:16.612	110.239	25
26	55	(Brazil) Tony Kanaan	Mo Nunn Racing	1:19.834	105.790	WD

== Warm-up ==
A half-hour warm-up session was held on Sunday at 10:00 a.m. Eastern Daylight Time (UTC−04:00) for teams to make their final adjustments prior to the race. Vasser was the fastest driver of the session at 1 minute, 16.015 seconds, with Carpentier in second, da Matta in third, Tagliani in fourth, and Castoneves in fifth. The session was stopped once for Jourdain staling on-course with a fuel pressure issue and a second time for Fittipaldi contacting a wall at the eleventh turn. The damage done to the rear of Fittipaldi's car forced him to resort to a backup car for the race.

== Race ==
The race had a scheduled distance of 72 laps and 168.912 mi (271.838 km). The weather conditions towards the beginning of the race were described as "perfect", with air temperatures recorded from 82 to 86 °F (28 to 30 °C) and track temperatures from 114 to 123 °F (46 to 51 °C). About 44,000 spectators attended the race, down from 50,500 spectators in 2000. The green flag was waved by CART starter Jim Swintal at 2:05 p.m. local time to start the race. Carpentier steered to the outside line and moved from sixth to fourth in turn one. By the end of the first lap, Castroneves held a 0.4-second lead over Junqueira. Three laps later, Jourdain pulled alongside Zanardi in the third turn and their tires collided, sending them both spinning into a tire barrier. The crash brought an early end to the 200th CART race for Jourdain's team, Bettenhausen Racing. The first caution flag of the race was issued as a result. Papis and Tracy were the only drivers to make pit stops under the caution.

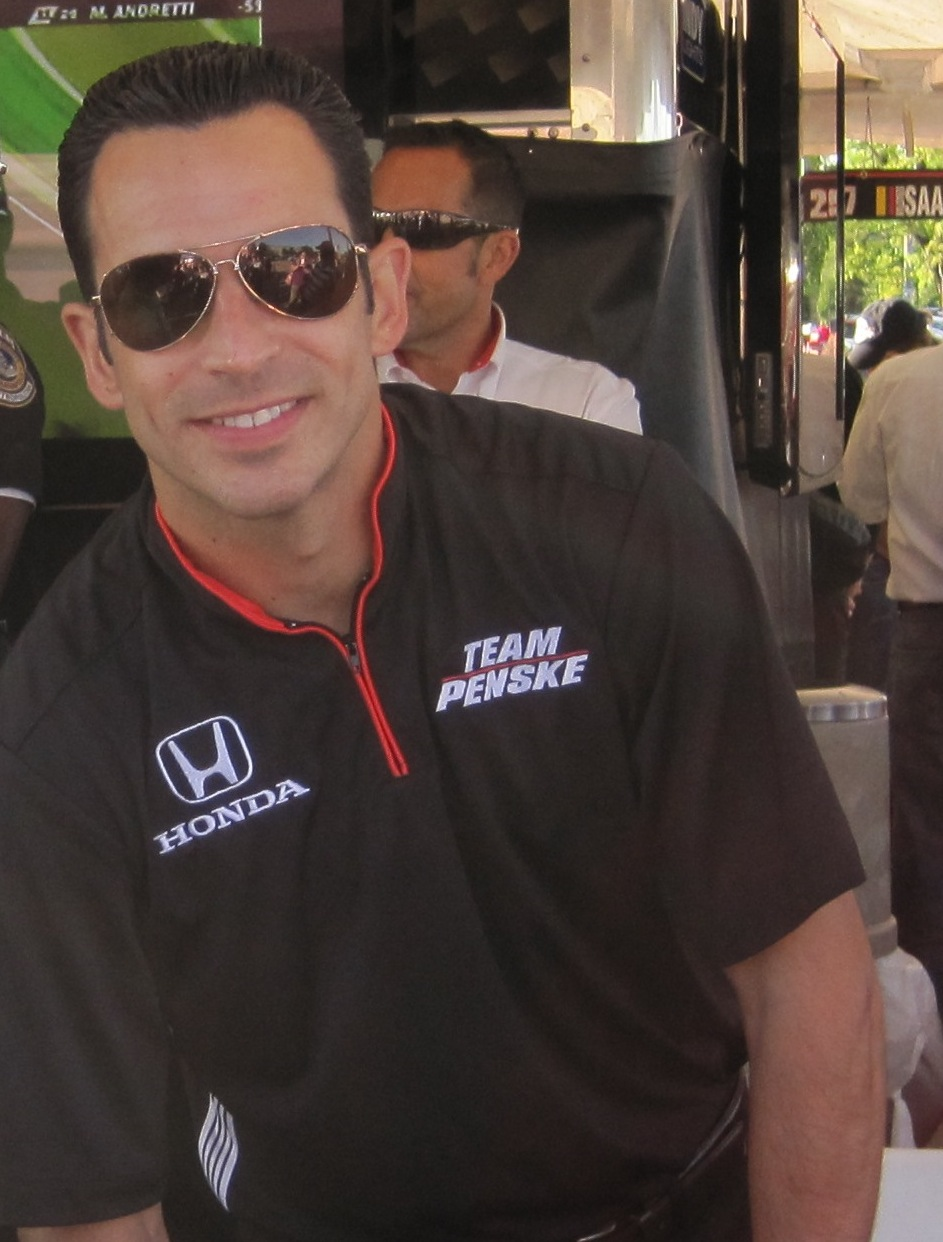
Hélio Castroneves (pictured in 2010) earned his second win at Belle Isle.

Castroneves brought the field back to green-flag racing on the seventh lap. He continued to maintain his lead, but was put under pressure by Junqueira. Meanwhile, Franchitti's engine momentarily cut out on the tenth lap, allowing Vasser to overtake him. Franchitti remained on Vasser's trail and eventually got by him for fifth place on lap 20. Due to poor fuel mileage, Bräck made a stop on the 27th lap, dropping from 15th to 19th place and beginning the first cycle of green-flag pit stops. That same lap, Dixon spun and stalled in the 12th turn, prompting a local caution flag. By the time safety marshals restarted his car, he had already lost a lap to the leaders. On lap 29, Junqueira's gearbox suddenly lost power and he fell to fifth place behind de Ferran, Carpentier, and Franchitti. The issue allowed Castroneves to extend his lead to 7.8 seconds. Castroneves made his first stop for tires and fuel on lap 32 with de Ferran, Franchitti, and Moreno, but because the other leaders pitted the lap prior, he kept the first position. Tracy inherited the second position until he drove into pit road on lap 36 in what was intended to be his final stop, hoping that several cautions would come out to maintain his fuel.

Five laps later, the second caution was issued when Minassian skidded into a tire barrier in turn seven, while Tagliani experienced a brake failure and slammed nose-first into a tire wall at the 12th corner. Takagi also pulled off-course in the third turn to retire from the race. The top 17 drivers, expect Tracy, made their final stops during the caution. On the 42nd lap, Junqueira lost control and spun against the tire barrier in turn eight. Vasser also collided with a wall while warming his tires and retired from the seventh position. The race was restarted four laps later with Castroneves, Carpentier, de Ferran, Franchitti, and Moreno in the top-five. During the restart, Andretti passed Tracy for sixth place. On the 55th lap, de Ferran's engine malfunctioned, and he slipped from third to eighth place before his engine refired in the third turn. Two laps later, Servià crashed into the left-side wall in turn 12 after driving over deteriorating asphalt, prompting the third caution.

Green-flag racing resumed on the 61st lap. Franchitti planned on passing Carpentier for second, but remained in third place after the two drivers nearly collided. Herta drove into the marbles and hit the turn-12 wall with the nose of his car, causing the fourth (and final) caution to be flown. Castroneves quickly pulled away during the restart on lap 66. Franchitti out-braked Carpentier in the third turn to take the second position, but briefly experienced oversteer, causing Carpentier to let off the throttle to avoid a collision. Moreno then made wheel-to-wheel contact with Carpentier for third place. As Carpentier fought to regain grip, he dropped to seventh place by the end of the lap. Castroneves, undeterred from Franchitti's quick pace, held the lead for the remaining six laps to take his fifth CART victory, his second of the season, and his sixth win in American open-wheel car racing. In addition, he became the first driver to win the Detroit Grand Prix as a CART event in two consecutive years. (Note: When the Detroit Grand Prix was a Formula One race, Ayrton Senna won the race in three consecutive years (1986–1988).) Franchitti was second, 0.702 seconds behind Castroneves, while Moreno finished third, his first podium finish since the 2000 Marlboro 500. Andretti set the fastest lap time of the race on the penultimate lap (1:16.010) and took fourth. Tracy ran out of fuel on the final lap and retired from the race, allowing Fittipaldi to assume fifth. De Ferran, da Matta, Carpentier, Bräck, and Gugelmin completed the top-ten finishers, and Papis and Fernández were the final two classified finishers. There were no lead changes in the race, meaning that Castroneves had led all 72 laps.

== Post-race ==
After the race, Castroneves climbed the catch fence, continuing his traditional victory celebration that started with his first CART win at Detroit in 2000. He later expressed jubilance in his win, saying: "What a day! Everything went perfect, like a watch. It was a dream come true to come back to where I had my first win and repeat the victory. This is my town! I knew that when we got the pole yesterday we would be able to win this race if we just stayed calm and focused. It's not always the fastest car that wins, it's the most consistent and everything went our way today." He also attributed the win to his pit crew and the Firestone tires. Second-place Franchitti explained that his pass on Carpentier nearly went awry when he tried to turn the corner: "I was carrying a bit too much speed and I was on the marbles and I picked up some on my tires. I wasn't sure if I was going to make the corner, so I banged it into second gear, and then down another (gear) to make it around. I got a lot of wheelspin and it was kind of messy, but I got it done." Moreno, who finished third, was glad to have earned a podium amidst "a very tough beginning of the season" and thanked his team for his performance.

A disappointed Tracy said of his retirement: "We were just playing a fuel strategy game and it didn't pay off. But we were right there. It's tough for me, but it's probably tougher on the Team KOOL Green crew. They had to work hard all weekend and deserved to be rewarded with a good finish." Vasser admitted that he "flat blew it" while warming his tires and stated: "With hot tires you pick up a lot of the sand material and marbles. I was working hard trying to keep the tires clean and I just lost it. Going into the race I felt I had a car that could win the race, but the way the race was unfolding it didn’t look good. The car was good and I am sorry for Patrick Racing and my sponsor Visteon." Zanardi spoke negatively of his car's handling and felt that Jourdain's attempt to overtake him on lap three was "a little late"; Jourdain conversely blamed Zanardi, opining: "I had my car on the inside line to the corner and I'm sure he saw me. But he turned across the front of me anyway and put us both out."

Robert Clarke felt vindicated that a Honda-powered car won the Grand Prix of Detroit after the spacer controversy erupted on Friday. However, he revealed that he was still pursuing legal action to resolve the dispute after learning of "disturbing" information that led to CART mandating the spacer. In the meantime, Honda would redesign their engine plenum to better fit the spacer. A day after the Grand Prix of Cleveland, a second hearing of Honda's protest was held at the Wyndham Cleveland Hotel, in which a panel consisting of three judges ruled that the spacer would not be implemented until August 8, ahead of the Miller Lite 200 at Mid-Ohio. The decision prompted criticism from Toyota, stating that they were "extremely disappointed with the ruling". The dispute was finally resolved on July 16, when CART announced that all three engine manufacturers agreed to use the spacer for the rest of the season, beginning with the Michigan 500.

Hours after the race, Bud Stanner and CART CEO Joe Heitzler issued a joint statement, revealing that they held a private hour-long meeting to discuss the future of the Detroit Grand Prix. They hoped to explore their options to continue the race, including bringing the event back to the original street circuit in downtown Detroit. However, the event was excluded from the series' 2002 schedule, and was ultimately put on hiatus until 2007, when it became an IRL IndyCar Series race.

Bräck maintained his lead in the Drivers' Championship with 74 points after the race, but his gap over Castroneves shrunk to five points. Andretti's fourth-place finish propelled him from seventh to third in the standings, while da Matta dropped to fourth and de Ferran improved to fifth. Reynard, on 114 points, overtook Lola with a six-point lead for the Constructors' Cup. Having earned 108 points, Honda extended their lead over Toyota to 10 points in the Manufacturers' Cup standings as Ford-Cosworth remained third on 78 points with 14 races left in the season.

=== Race classification ===
Drivers who scored championship points are denoted in bold.

Final race results
Pos	No.	Driver	Team	Laps	Time/Retired	Grid	Points
1	3	**(Brazil) Hélio Castroneves**	**Team Penske**	72	1:53:51.815	1	**22**^{1}^{2}
2	27	**(United Kingdom) Dario Franchitti**	**Team Green**	72	+0.702	4	**16**
3	20	**(Brazil) Roberto Moreno**	**Patrick Racing**	72	+2.891	7	**14**
4	39	**(United States) Michael Andretti**	**Team Motorola**	72	+3.386	13	**12**
5	11	**(Brazil) Christian Fittipaldi**	**Newman/Haas Racing**	72	+13.465	8	**10**
6	1	**(Brazil) Gil de Ferran**	**Team Penske**	72	+14.577	3	**8**
7	6	**(Brazil) Cristiano da Matta**	**Newman/Haas Racing**	72	+15.084	17	**6**
8	32	**(Canada) Patrick Carpentier**	**Forsythe Championship Racing**	72	+15.829	6	**5**
9	8	**(Sweden) Kenny Bräck**	**Team Rahal**	72	+16.320	10	**4**
10	17	**(Brazil) Maurício Gugelmin**	**PacWest Racing**	72	+19.675	12	**3**
11	7	**(Italy) Max Papis**	**Team Rahal**	72	+20.055	24	**2**
12	51	**(Mexico) Adrián Fernández**	**Fernández Racing**	72	+26.854	15	**1**
13	52	(Japan) Shinji Nakano	Fernández Racing	72	+26.991	9	
14	26	(Canada) Paul Tracy	Team Green	71	Out Of Fuel	23	
15	77	(United States) Bryan Herta	Forsythe Championship Racing	61	Contact	22	
16	22	(Spain) Oriol Servià	Sigma Autosport	56	Contact	11	
17	12	(France) Nicolas Minassian	Chip Ganassi Racing	51	Transmission	14	
18	40	(United States) Jimmy Vasser	Patrick Racing	43	Contact	5	
19	4	(Brazil) Bruno Junqueira	Chip Ganassi Racing	41	Transmission	2	
20	5	(Japan) Toranosuke Takagi	Walker Racing	40	Transmission	25	
21	33	(Canada) Alex Tagliani	Forsythe Championship Racing	39	Contact	20	
22	18	(New Zealand) Scott Dixon	PacWest Racing	37	Driveshaft	18	
23	25	(Brazil) Max Wilson	Arciero-Brooke Racing	36	Gearbox	21	
24	66	(Italy) Alex Zanardi	Mo Nunn Racing	3	Contact	16	
25	16	(Mexico) Michel Jourdain Jr.	Bettenhausen Racing	3	Contact	19	

Notes

- **^1** – Includes one bonus point for being the fastest qualifier.
- **^2** – Includes one bonus point for leading the most laps.

== Championship standings after the race ==
Drivers' Championship standings
+/–	Pos	Driver	Points
	1	(Sweden) Kenny Bräck	74
	2	(Brazil) Hélio Castroneves	69 (–5)
4	3	(United States) Michael Andretti	48 (–26)
1	4	(Brazil) Cristiano da Matta	46 (–28)
2	5	(Brazil) Gil de Ferran	44 (–30)

Constructors' Cup standings
+/–	Pos	Constructor	Points
1	1	(United Kingdom) Reynard	114
1	2	(United Kingdom) Lola	108 (–6)

Manufacturers' Cup standings
+/–	Pos	Manufacturer	Points
	1	(Japan) Honda	108
	2	(Japan) Toyota	98 (–10)
	3	(United Kingdom) Ford-Cosworth	78 (–30)

== Notes and references ==
=== References ===
Previous race: 2001 Miller Lite 225	CART FedEx Championship Series; 2001 season	Next race: 2001 Freightliner/G.I. Joes 200
Previous race: 2000 Tenneco Automotive Grand Prix of Detroit	Tenneco Automotive Grand Prix of Detroit	Next race: 2007 Detroit Indy Grand Prix (IRL IndyCar Series)
