= 2007 Detroit Indy Grand Prix =

Race held in Belle Isle Park, Michigan

(United States) 2007 Detroit Indy Grand Prix
Race details
Race 16 of 17 in the 2007 IndyCar Series season
| ← Previous race | Next race → |
- Layout of the Raceway at Belle Isle
- Date: September 2, 2007
- Official name: Detroit Indy Grand Prix presented by Firestone
- Location: Raceway at Belle Isle; Belle Isle Park, Michigan, United States
- Course: Temporary street circuit 2.070 mi / 3.331 km
- Distance: 89 laps 184.230 mi / 296.489 km
- Scheduled Distance: 90 laps 186.300 mi / 299.821 km
- Weather: Sunny with temperatures reaching up to 78.1 °F (25.6 °C); wind speeds up to 10.2 miles per hour (16.4 km/h)

Pole position
- Driver: (Brazil) Hélio Castroneves (Team Penske)
- Time: 1:12.0688

Fastest lap
- Driver: (United Kingdom) Dario Franchitti (Andretti Green Racing)
- Time: 1:13.5110 (on lap 65 of 89)

Podium
- First: (Brazil) Tony Kanaan (Andretti Green Racing)
- Second: (United States) Danica Patrick (Andretti Green Racing)
- Third: (United Kingdom) Dan Wheldon (Chip Ganassi Racing)

The 2007 Detroit Indy Grand Prix presented by Firestone was an IRL IndyCar Series open-wheel race that was held on September 2, 2007 at the Raceway at Belle Isle in Belle Isle Park, Michigan. It was the 16th and penultimate round of the 2007 IRL IndyCar Series and the 21st running of the event (first under Indy Racing League (IRL) sanctioning). Originally scheduled for 90 laps, the race was shortened to 89 laps because of a time limit. The race was won by Tony Kanaan for the Andretti Green Racing team. Danica Patrick finished second, and Dan Wheldon clinched third.

Hélio Castroneves earned his seventh pole position of the season in qualifying, a record-high for the series, and led the race for the first 26 laps. Dario Franchitti look over the lead when Castroneves pitted, and maintained it until lap 49 when he made a pit stop and relinquished the position to Buddy Rice. Rice held the lead for seven laps before it passed to Patrick, and then back to Franchitti. Kanaan took the lead on lap 70, staying on the track while most of the field pitted during a caution, and remained at the front for the rest of the race. Behind him, Rice was running in second position, but on the penultimate lap of the race, he ran out of fuel and slowed suddenly, causing Scott Dixon to collide with him, and spin the pair into the barriers. Franchitti, who was running just behind the pair, collided into Dixon, but kept running and finished in sixth.

There were six cautions and five lead changes among five drivers during the race. It was Kanaan's 12th win in the IndyCar Series and his fifth (and final) win of the 2007 season. (Note: Counting his one win in CART, this was Kanaan's 13th win in American open-wheel car racing.) The final result gave Franchitti the lead in the Drivers' Championship by three points over Dixon with one race remaining in the season.

== Background ==
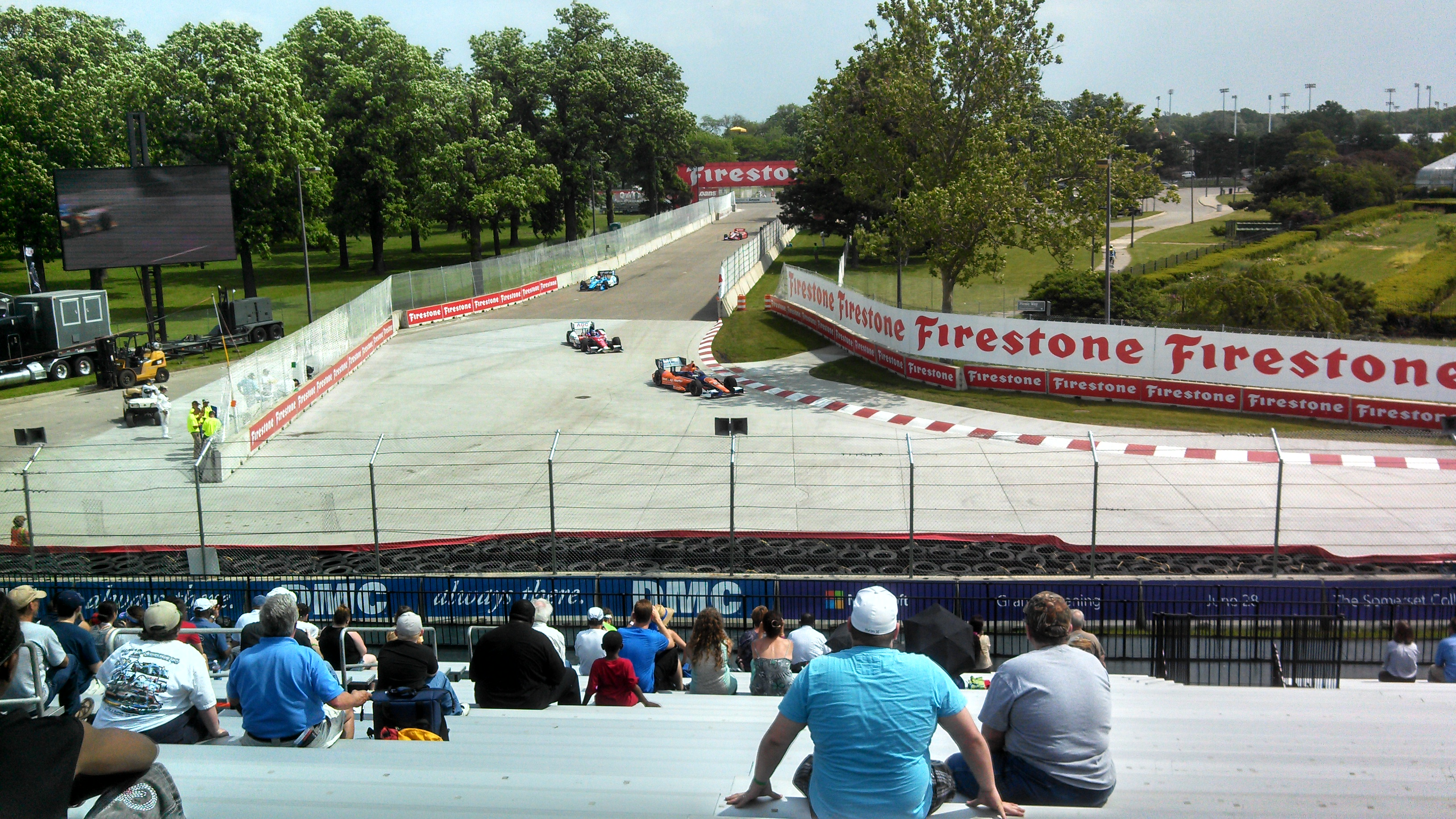
The Raceway at Belle Isle (pictured in 2013), where the race was held.

The Detroit Indy Grand Prix had not been held since 2001 because the contract between event promoter International Management Group and Championship Auto Racing Teams (CART), the organization that sanctioned the race since 1989, had expired that year and attendance rates were dwindling. In September 2006, team owner Roger Penske and Detroit mayor Kwame Kilpatrick announced that the event would debut on the IRL IndyCar Series schedule on September 2, 2007, with an American Le Mans Series race being held the day prior. Penske spearheaded the efforts to bring the race back following the successes of the 2005 MLB All-Star Game and Super Bowl XLI in the city. The race was to be held over a distance of 90 laps and 186.3 mi (299.8 km) on the 14-turn, 2.07 mi (3.33 km) Raceway at Belle Isle, a street circuit in Belle Isle Park, Michigan, United States, which had been slightly altered to give drivers more passing opportunities. It was the 16th of 17 open-wheel races for the 2007 IRL IndyCar Series and the last non-oval track race of the season. The 18 cars that were entered for the race used Honda Indy V8 engines, Firestone tires, and Dallara IR-05 chassis.

Heading into the Detroit Indy Grand Prix, Chip Ganassi Racing (CGR) driver Scott Dixon led the Drivers' Championship with 560 points, four more than second-place Dario Franchitti. Tony Kanaan trailed Dixon by 62 points, while Dan Wheldon and Sam Hornish Jr. rounded out the top-five with 414 and 409 points, respectively. The season's previous round, the Motorola Indy 300 at Infineon Raceway, saw controversy erupt between Andretti Green Racing (AGR) teammates Franchitti and Marco Andretti. As Andretti accelerated out of pit road on the 68th lap, Franchitti collided into the rear of his car in the second turn. Franchitti opted not to repair the damage that he sustained to his front wing, which caused his pace to diminish and allowed Dixon to pass him for the win and the championship lead shortly after a late restart. Days after the race, Franchitti revealed he had not yet talked to AGR team owner Michael Andretti because he "wasn't impressed" with how Andretti blamed him for the collision.

Hélio Castroneves, who won the last two CART races in Detroit, took part in a compatibility test conducted by the Indy Racing League (IRL) at Belle Isle on July 24. He was pleased with the alterations that were made to the circuit and predicted: "You're not going see someone get out in front and fly away. The race is going to be awesome to watch." Dixon acknowledged that some sections of the track surface had been smoothed out and wanted to begin the weekend "with an open mind and race it as if it was any other event." 1999 Detroit Grand Prix winner Dario Franchitti felt that his and AGR teammate Tony Kanaan's experience at the track would provide them an advantage over other drivers at the beginning of the first practice session, but by the end of the session, everyone would become acquainted to the circuit.

== Practice ==
Three practice sessions preceded the race on Sunday; the first session on Friday morning lasted 120 minutes, while the second session on Friday afternoon and the third session on Saturday morning lasted 60 minutes. Additionally, the 18 drivers were split into two groups for the last two sessions, with each group being allowed 30 minutes of track time. The groups were determined by the lap times of the first session.

Franchitti lapped the quickest time of the first practice session at 1 minute and 13.3447 seconds, with Castroneves, Kanaan, Dixon, and Sam Hornish Jr. completing the top five. The start of the session was delayed by seven minutes because of repairs to the track. The session was stopped three times, the first for Kanaan spinning in turn three, the second for debris in turn four, and the third for Buddy Rice crashing into a wall in turn two. Dixon spun into the tire barrier in turn three and damaged the rear of his car ten minutes into the session, though no caution flag was issued because he drove away without stalling his car.

In the second practice session, Castroneves set the fastest overall lap on Friday with a time of 1 minute, 13.3130 seconds, beating Franchitti, Dixon, Kanaan, and Marco Andretti. The session ended under caution as Hornish Jr. contacted the turn-three wall. Dixon was the fastest driver of the third practice session with a 1 minute, 12.4039-second lap; Castroneves, Kanaan, Franchitti, and Andretti took the remaining top-five spots. Dixon and Rice were allotted ten extra minutes of practice because of their incidents the previous day. In the first group, Sarah Fisher's car stopped on-course in the ninth turn, while in the second group, Franchitti wrecked into the turn-six barrier.

== Qualifying ==
The qualifying session was held on Saturday, two hours after the third practice session concluded, and featured two rounds. In the first round, each driver was to complete one timed lap around the circuit. The six fastest drivers would advance to the second round, named Firestone Fast Six, in which they were given ten minutes to set their fastest laps. With a lap time of 1 minute and 12.0688 seconds, Castroneves earned his 23rd career pole position in the IndyCar Series and his seventh of the season, breaking a series record set by Billy Boat in 1998 for the most poles in a single season. (Note: Counting his seven poles in CART, this was Castroneves' 30th pole in American open-wheel car racing.) Franchitti qualified in second place with a time that was 0.0742 seconds slower than Castroneves'. Dixon took third, Kanaan fourth, and Ryan Hunter-Reay fifth, while the remaining top-ten drivers were Andretti, Hornish Jr., Darren Manning, Tomas Scheckter, and Vítor Meira. The starting grid was completed by Danica Patrick, Ed Carpenter, A. J. Foyt IV, Kosuke Matsuura, Rice, Dan Wheldon, Scott Sharp, and Fisher. After qualifying, Castroneves attributed his speed to his team and was anticipatory for the race.

=== Qualifying classification ===
Final qualifying results
| Pos. | No. | Driver | Team | Time | Speed | Grid |
|---|---|---|---|---|---|---|
| 1 | 3 | (Brazil) Hélio Castroneves | Team Penske | 1:12.0688 | 103.401 | 1 |
| 2 | 27 | (United Kingdom) Dario Franchitti | Andretti Green Racing | 1:12.1430 | 103.295 | 2 |
| 3 | 9 | (New Zealand) Scott Dixon | Chip Ganassi Racing | 1:12.5830 | 102.669 | 3 |
| 4 | 11 | (Brazil) Tony Kanaan | Andretti Green Racing | 1:12.8451 | 102.299 | 4 |
| 5 | 17 | (United States) Ryan Hunter-Reay | Rahal Letterman Racing | 1:13.3434 | 101.604 | 5 |
| 6 | 26 | (United States) Marco Andretti | Andretti Green Racing | 1:13.3840 | 101.548 | 6 |
| 7 | 6 | (United States) Sam Hornish Jr. | Team Penske | 1:13.6224 | 101.219 | 7 |
| 8 | 14 | (United Kingdom) Darren Manning | A. J. Foyt Racing | 1:14.1814 | 100.456 | 8 |
| 9 | 2 | (South Africa) Tomas Scheckter | Vision Racing | 1:14.2015 | 100.429 | 9 |
| 10 | 4 | (Brazil) Vítor Meira | Panther Racing | 1:14.2889 | 100.311 | 10 |
| 11 | 7 | (United States) Danica Patrick | Andretti Green Racing | 1:14.4061 | 100.153 | 11 |
| 12 | 20 | (United States) Ed Carpenter | Vision Racing | 1:15.1738 | 99.130 | 12 |
| 13 | 22 | (United States) A. J. Foyt IV | Vision Racing | 1:15.5708 | 98.610 | 13 |
| 14 | 55 | (Japan) Kosuke Matsuura | Panther Racing | 1:15.5998 | 98.572 | 14 |
| 15 | 15 | (United States) Buddy Rice | Dreyer & Reinbold Racing | 1:15.7886 | 98.326 | 15 |
| 16 | 10 | (United Kingdom) Dan Wheldon | Chip Ganassi Racing | 1:15.8588 | 98.235 | 16 |
| 17 | 8 | (United States) Scott Sharp | Rahal Letterman Racing | 1:16.2611 | 97.717 | 17 |
| 18 | 5 | (United States) Sarah Fisher | Dreyer & Reinbold Racing | 1:20.8682 | 92.150 | 18 |

== Warm-up ==
A 30-minute warm-up session was held early Sunday morning ahead of the race. Castroneves' 1 minute, 13.5251 second-lap was the fastest of the session, ahead of Dixon, Franchitti, Kanaan, and Scheckter. Six minutes into the session, Scheckter caused the first of three cautions when he spun in the third turn. Castroneves later hit the rear of Dixon's car at the third turn, sending him spinning into the tire barrier. The session ended with Wheldon crashing into the turn-eight tire barrier, sustaining damage to the left-rear of his car and the rear wing.

== Race ==
Live television coverage of the race in the United States was aired on ABC and began on Sunday at 3:30 p.m. Eastern Daylight Time (UTC−04:00). Weather conditions at the start of the race were warm and sunny, with air temperatures recorded at 78 to 81 °F (26 to 27 °C) and track temperatures at 98 to 118 °F (37 to 48 °C). Larry Jutte, the vice president of Product Purchasing for American Honda Motor Company, commanded the drivers to start their engines, three-time Indianapolis 500 winner Johnny Rutherford drove the pace car, and Detroit Pistons president Joe Dumars waved the green flag to start the race. Castroneves maintained his pole position advantage to lead the first lap, while Kanaan overtook Dixon for third and Andretti contacted the barrier in the sixth turn as he passed Ryan Hunter-Reay for fifth. Over the next ten laps, Castroneves extended his lead over Franchitti to 1.3 seconds. Wheldon, meanwhile, made an early pit stop for fuel on the eighth lap, as did Rice three laps later. Castroneves' lead was condensed by the 13th lap as he lapped Sarah Fisher.

Franchitti, Kanaan, Dixon, and Hornish Jr. were the first drivers to pit in the first cycle of green-flag pit stops on lap 21. Three laps later, Hunter-Reay made a stop, but failed to exit his pit stall because of a broken drive shaft. Castroneves made his stop on the 26th lap along with Andretti and Scheckter, handing the lead to Franchitti. The first caution flag of the race was issued two laps later when Ed Carpenter's car skidded off-course in turn eight. Andretti retired from the race under the caution period as a result of a faulty gearbox. During the ensuing restart on lap 31, Fisher turned down into Hornish Jr. as they entered turn one while Darren Manning simultaneously clipped the rear of Danica Patrick's car. Vítor Meira drove up the track in an attempt to avoid the crash, but hit Fisher's car. Hornish Jr. climbed out of his car while covering his hand with an ice bag, though no serious injuries were reported. The multi-car accident prompted the second caution flag. Patrick, Wheldon, Kosuke Matsuura, Carpenter, and Rice all stopped for tires and fuel.

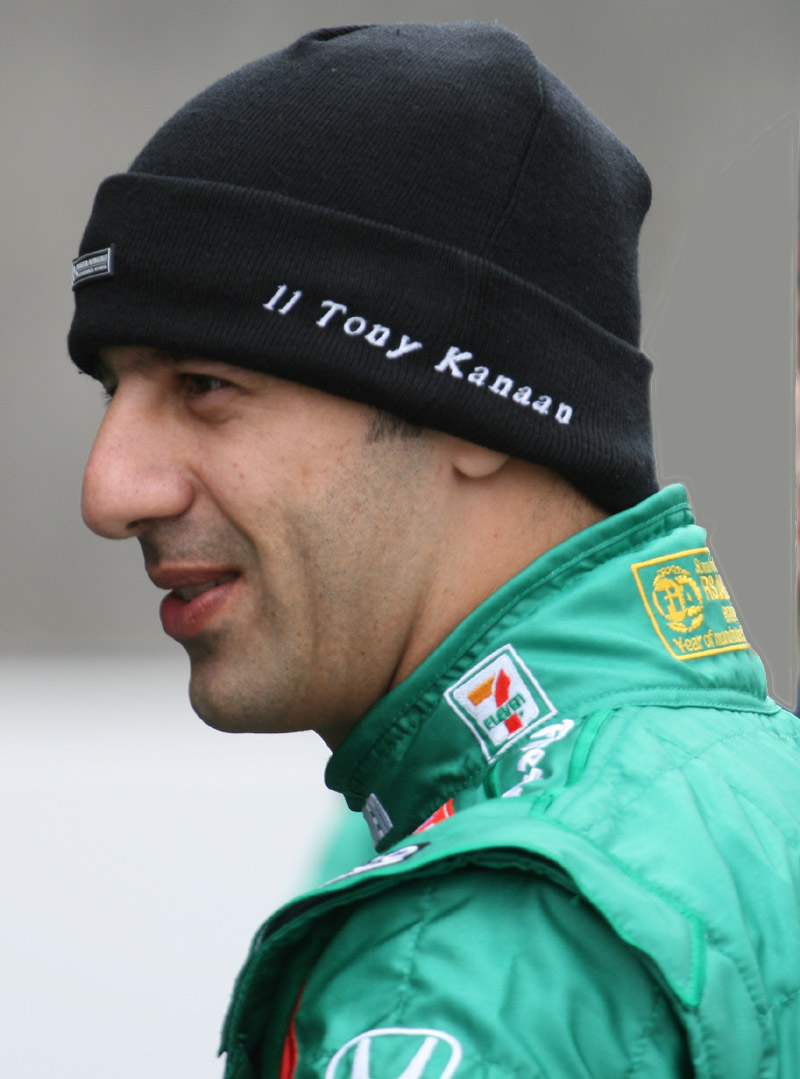
Tony Kanaan (pictured in 2008) earned his fifth win of the season.

The race restarted on the 38th lap, with Franchitti leading ahead of Kanaan, Dixon, Castroneves, and Scheckter. Franchitti held a lead as big as 1.4 seconds over Kanaan before the third caution was flown on lap 48, when Patrick spun Scott Sharp into the tire barrier in the eighth corner. Most of the leaders made pit stops under caution for tires and fuel, with Kanaan exiting pit road before Franchitti. Rice, Patrick, and Wheldon elected to stay on the circuit and led the field back up to speed on lap 50. The caution flag was thrown for the fourth time on the 56th lap when Carpenter spun in turn 13. While Rice, Kanaan, and Castroneves filled up on fuel, Patrick did not pit and assumed the lead ahead of the lap-58 restart, with Wheldon in second, Franchitti in third, Dixon in fourth, and Scheckter in fifth. Franchitti improved to second place on the 64th lap as Wheldon pitted; two laps later, Patrick made a stop, allowing Franchitti to reclaim the lead. On lap 68, Castroneves contacted Scheckter and both drivers crashed into the barrier in turn one, causing the fifth caution flag of the race. Castroneves confronted Scheckter as he exited the track's medical center.

Leaders Franchitti and Dixon pitted solely for fuel under the caution; Dixon drove off of pit road ahead of Franchitti. Kanaan conversely chose not to pit and took the lead for the restart on the 72nd lap, with Rice, Dixon, Patrick, and A. J. Foyt IV occupying the remaining top-five positions. By lap 73, Franchitti improved from sixth to fourth. On lap 80, IRL officials announced that the race would end once it reached the series' mandated road or street course time limit of two hours and ten minutes. Rice remained within a second of Kanaan's lead until his car suddenly ran out of fuel in turn 13 on lap 88. Dixon attempted to maneuver around Rice by driving to his right side, but collided into him and sent him into the tire barrier. As Dixon backed into a wall, he blocked the path of Franchitti, who promptly hit the right side of Dixon's car. The crash brought about the race-ending sixth caution flag.

Kanaan earned his 12th IndyCar Series win and his fifth of the season. Patrick was able to avoid the crash and took second place, the best race result of her career thus far, while Wheldon finished third and Darren Manning and Kosuke Matsuura completed the top five. With assistance from safety marshals, Franchitti's car was restarted, and he finished sixth. Dixon was ultimately classified in eighth place as his engine did not refire. The race's attrition rate was high, as nine of the 18 starters failed to finish the race. During the course of the race, there were five lead changes between five different drivers. Franchitti led a race-high 27 laps, while winner Kanaan led once for a total of 20 laps.

=== Post-race ===
Kanaan, Patrick, and Wheldon celebrated their respective finishes on the podium. Kanaan, who earned US$131,400 for his win, discussed the struggles he faced in the race: "It was a tough race. We got a good start. I got ahead of Dario (Franchitti) and at that point I had to save fuel because we did not put a lot of fuel in. The luck was on my side, we got another yellow and that worked out perfectly." He also pointed out the criticism he faced for his driving the previous week at Infineon and believed that his win was a product of positive karma for helping his teammate. Patrick spoke of a "fun-filled day" and thanked her team for devising her pit strategy: "My team did a great job of putting the Motorola car in the right spot at the right time with the strategy. Track position was absolutely everything today, so they did a good job." Wheldon praised Roger Penske for his efforts to bring back the event, saying that it is "the kind of thing that IndyCar needs," and called the race "entertaining" from the fans' standpoint.

An enraged Michael Andretti accused Dixon of intentionally wrecking Franchitti: "Poor sportsmanship is what I saw. He took Dario out on purpose. He saw that Dario was going to be able to get by him, so he let off the brake and took Dario out. It was totally on purpose." Kanaan initially held a similar opinion, but later recanted it upon looking at a replay and apologized to Dixon. The lap-88 crash also led to an argument on pit road between AGR co-owner Kevin Savoree and Chip Ganassi Racing owner Chip Ganassi. Dixon insisted that he "had no control of the car" and would not have made an attempt to pass Rice if he did not run out of fuel. Franchitti also dismissed Andretti's accusation and felt that "Scott (Dixon) has raced me cleanly all year and I've raced him cleanly. So going on past form this season, I don't think he would have done it intentionally." Rice apologized to Chip Ganassi, CGR manager Mike Hull, and Franchitti after the race and expressed his disappointment for negatively affecting the championship.

With one race left in the season, Franchitti advanced back into the lead of the Drivers' Championship with 587 points, three more than Dixon. Kanaan, who trailed Franchitti by 39 points, was the only other driver that was still in contention for the title. Wheldon, on 449 points, extended his gap over Hornish Jr. to 22 points for fourth place in the championship.

=== Race classification ===
Final race results
| Pos. | No. | Driver | Team | Laps | Time/Retired | Grid | Laps led | Points |
|---|---|---|---|---|---|---|---|---|
| 1 | 11 | (Brazil) Tony Kanaan | Andretti Green Racing | 89 | 2:11:50.5097 | 4 | 20 | 50 |
| 2 | 7 | (United States) Danica Patrick | Andretti Green Racing | 89 | +0.4865 | 11 | 9 | 40 |
| 3 | 10 | (United Kingdom) Dan Wheldon | Chip Ganassi Racing | 89 | +1.2207 | 16 | 0 | 35 |
| 4 | 14 | (United Kingdom) Darren Manning | A. J. Foyt Racing | 89 | +1.9217 | 8 | 0 | 32 |
| 5 | 55 | (Japan) Kosuke Matsuura | Panther Racing | 88 | +1 lap | 14 | 0 | 30 |
| 6 | 27 | (United Kingdom) Dario Franchitti | Andretti Green Racing | 88 | +1 lap | 2 | 27 | 31^{1} |
| 7 | 15 | (United States) Buddy Rice | Dreyer & Reinbold Racing | 87 | Contact | 15 | 7 | 26 |
| 8 | 9 | (New Zealand) Scott Dixon | Chip Ganassi Racing | 87 | Contact | 3 | 0 | 24 |
| 9 | 22 | (United States) A. J. Foyt IV | Vision Racing | 87 | Mechanical | 13 | 0 | 22 |
| 10 | 20 | (United States) Ed Carpenter | Vision Racing | 86 | +3 laps | 12 | 0 | 20 |
| 11 | 8 | (United States) Scott Sharp | Rahal Letterman Racing | 82 | +7 laps | 17 | 0 | 19 |
| 12 | 6 | (United States) Sam Hornish Jr. | Team Penske | 75 | +14 laps | 7 | 0 | 18 |
| 13 | 2 | (South Africa) Tomas Scheckter | Vision Racing | 67 | Contact | 9 | 0 | 17 |
| 14 | 3 | (Brazil) Hélio Castroneves | Team Penske | 67 | Contact | 1 | 26 | 16 |
| 15 | 4 | (Brazil) Vítor Meira | Panther Racing | 31 | Contact | 10 | 0 | 15 |
| 16 | 5 | (United States) Sarah Fisher | Dreyer & Reinbold Racing | 29 | Contact | 18 | 0 | 14 |
| 17 | 26 | (United States) Marco Andretti | Andretti Green Racing | 27 | Mechanical | 6 | 0 | 13 |
| 18 | 17 | (United States) Ryan Hunter-Reay | Rahal Letterman Racing | 24 | Mechanical | 5 | 0 | 12 |

Notes

- ^1 — Includes three bonus points for leading the most laps.

== Championship standings after the race ==
Drivers' Championship standings
| +/- | Pos. | Driver | Points |
|---|---|---|---|
| 1 | 1 | (United Kingdom) Dario Franchitti | 587 |
| 1 | 2 | (New Zealand) Scott Dixon | 584 (–3) |
| Unchanged | 3 | (Brazil) Tony Kanaan | 548 (–39) |
| Unchanged | 4 | (United Kingdom) Dan Wheldon | 449 (–138) |
| Unchanged | 5 | (United States) Sam Hornish Jr. | 427 (–160) |
Sources:

- Note: Only the top five positions are included.

== Notes ==
| Previous race: 2007 Motorola Indy 300 | IndyCar Series; 2007 season | Next race: 2007 Peak Antifreeze Indy 300 |
| Previous race: 2001 Tenneco Automotive; Grand Prix of Detroit | Detroit Indy Grand Prix | Next race: 2008 Detroit Indy Grand Prix |
