= Carl R. de Boor =

American mathematician (born 1937)

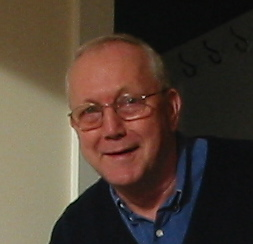
- Born: Carl-Wilhelm Reinhold de Boor; 3 December 1937 (age 88); Stolp, Germany (present-day Słupsk, Poland)
- Education: Hamburg University; Harvard University; University of Michigan (Ph.D.)
- Awards: John von Neumann Prize (1996); National Medal of Science (2003)
- Scientific career
- Fields: Mathematics (Numerical analysis)
- Workplaces: Purdue University; University of Wisconsin–Madison; University of Washington
- Thesis: The Method Of Projections As Applied To The Numerical Solution Of Two Point Boundary Value Problems Using Cubic Splines (1966)

Carl-Wilhelm Reinhold de Boor (born 3 December 1937) is an American mathematician and professor emeritus at the University of Wisconsin–Madison. In 1993, he was elected as a member of the National Academy of Engineering for contributions to numerical analysis and methods in particular numerical tools used in computer-aided design.

== Early life ==
de Boor was born in Stolp, Germany (now Słupsk, Poland), in 1937, as the seventh of eight children born to Werner (an anti-Nazi Lutheran minister) and Toni de Boor. The family fled in 1945, settling in Schwerin, then part of East Germany. He stayed in West Germany when his application to study chemistry at Humboldt University in East Berlin was turned down. He was supported by Otto Friedrich, the brother of Carl's father's first wife. Two years later, he began a romantic relationship with Otto's niece, Matilda Friedrich, the daughter of political scientist Carl Friedrich. With the support of the Friedrich family, Carl emigrated to the United States in 1959, learning English on his trip across the Atlantic.

== Education and career ==
de Boor discussing his life and career.

Having left Hamburg University without a degree, de Boor enrolled as a mathematics graduate student at Harvard. He worked briefly as a research assistant to Garrett Birkhoff before joining General Motors Research in Warren, Michigan, where he first encountered splines. He earned his Ph.D. from the University of Michigan in 1966, then joined Purdue University as an assistant professor. In 1972, he moved to the University of Wisconsin–Madison as a professor of mathematics and computer science, based at the Army Math Research Center.

== Retirement and personal life ==
Carl de Boor retired from the University of Wisconsin–Madison in 2003 and relocated to Orcas Island in Washington state, with his second wife, author Helen Bee, who he married in 1991. He is also an affiliated professor at the University of Washington.

== Awards ==
De Boor was elected to the United States National Academy of Sciences in 1997, and received the 2003 National Medal of Science in mathematics. Other honors have included election to the American Academy of Arts and Sciences in 1987 and the National Academy of Engineering in 1993, honorary degrees from Purdue University and Technion (the Israel Institute of Technology), as well as membership in the German Academy of Sciences Leopoldina in Germany and the Polish Academy of Sciences. He won the John von Neumann Lecture Prize from the Society for Industrial and Applied Mathematics in 1996 and the John A. Gregory Award of Geometric Design in 2009.
