= 2000 Tenneco Automotive Grand Prix of Detroit =

(United States) 2000 Detroit Grand Prix
Race details
- Race 7 of 20 in the 2000 CART season
- The Raceway on Belle Isle
- Date: June 18, 2000
- Official name: Tenneco Automotive Grand Prix of Detroit
- Location: Detroit Belle Isle street circuit
- Course: Temporary street circuit 2.35 mi / 3.78 km
- Distance: 84 laps 197.06 mi / 317.14 km
- Weather: Temperatures reaching up to 69.8 °F (21.0 °C); wind speeds up to 16.1 miles per hour (25.9 km/h)

Pole position
- Driver: (Colombia) Juan Pablo Montoya (Target Chip Ganassi)
- Time: 115.604 mph

Podium
- First: (Brazil) Hélio Castroneves (Team Penske)
- Second: (Italy) Max Papis (Team Rahal)
- Third: (Spain) Oriol Servià (PPI Motorsports)

The 2000 Tenneco Automotive Grand Prix of Detroit was a Championship Auto Racing Teams (CART) race that was held on June 18, 2000 on the Raceway on Belle Isle in Detroit, Michigan. It was the seventh race of the 2000 CART season. The race was won by Hélio Castroneves for Team Penske. Max Papis finished second, and Oriol Servià clinched third.

Preparations for the race were overshadowed by the news that CART CEO Andrew Craig had been voted out from his position, and his duties had been temporarily taken on by Bobby Rahal. Juan Pablo Montoya claimed pole position for the race, and led the first 58 laps of the race before he briefly relinquished the lead to Roberto Moreno when he made a pit stop. He regained first position a lap later, but only led for one more lap before he slowed down, and eventually cruised into the pit lane, and retired with a broken drive shaft. Castroneves took over the lead, and remained at the front for the rest of the race. To celebrate his win, Castroneves parked his car on the track, leapt out and climbed the fence, shaking it in jubilation. It was the first win that Castroneves, or any other racing driver, celebrated in this fashion, and he has since repeated the celebration for each of his victories, and it has also been mimicked by other drivers.

There were three cautions, totalling 10 laps during the race. It was Castroneves's first victory of his CART career, and he was the seventh different winner in the first seven races of the 2000 season. Of the 24 drivers that started, 14 were listed as running at the end of the race; four retired after contact, five retired with mechanical issues, and Paul Tracy was disqualified after he hit a crew member during service on pit lane.

== Classification ==
=== Race results ===
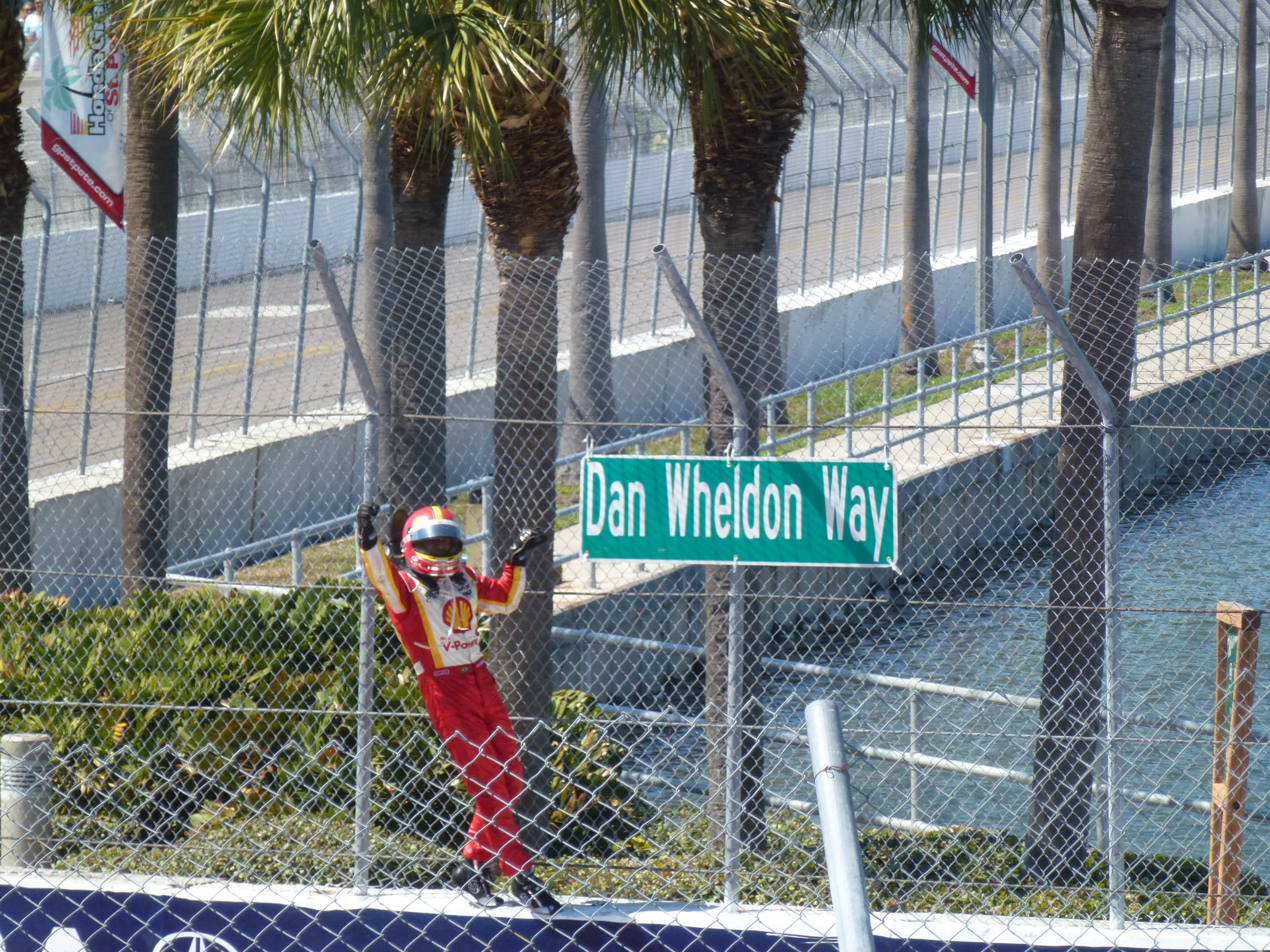
Hélio Castroneves, pictured here on the fence after winning the 2012 Honda Grand Prix of St. Petersburg, climbed the fence for the first time after winning the 2000 Grand Prix of Detroit.

| Pos | No. | Driver | Team | Laps | Time/Retired | Grid | Laps Led | Points |
|---|---|---|---|---|---|---|---|---|
| 1 | 3 | Hélio Castroneves | Team Penske | 84 | 2:01:23 | 3 | 24 | 20 |
| 2 | 7 | Max Papis | Team Rahal | 84 | | 5 | 0 | 16 |
| 3 | 96 | Oriol Servià | PPI Motorsports | 84 | | 12 | 0 | 14 |
| 4 | 27 | Dario Franchitti | Team Green | 84 | | 2 | 0 | 12 |
| 5 | 32 | Patrick Carpentier | Forsythe Racing | 84 | | 9 | 0 | 10 |
| 6 | 33 | Alex Tagliani | Forsythe Racing | 84 | | 14 | 0 | 8 |
| 7 | 12 | Jimmy Vasser | Chip Ganassi Racing | 84 | | 17 | 0 | 6 |
| 8 | 16 | Michel Jourdain Jr. | Bettenhausen Racing | 84 | | 16 | 0 | 5 |
| 9 | 2 | Gil de Ferran | Team Penske | 83 | +1 lap | 4 | 0 | 4 |
| 10 | 34 | Tarso Marques | Dale Coyne Racing | 82 | +2 laps | 21 | 0 | 3 |
| 11 | 18 | Mark Blundell | PacWest Racing | 81 | +3 laps | 15 | 0 | 2 |
| 12 | 19 | Takuya Kurosawa | Dale Coyne Racing | 81 | +3 laps | 23 | 0 | 1 |
| 13 | 6 | Michael Andretti | Newman/Haas Racing | 80 | Mechanical | 11 | 0 | 0 |
| 14 | 10 | Norberto Fontana | Della Penna Motorsports | 78 | Mechanical | 20 | 0 | 0 |
| 15 | 5 | Shinji Nakano | Walker Motorsport | 78 | +6 laps | 22 | 0 | 0 |
| 16 | 17 | Maurício Gugelmin | PacWest Racing | 78 | +6 laps | 18 | 0 | 0 |
| 17 | 20 | Roberto Moreno | Patrick Racing | 65 | Contact | 10 | 1 | 0 |
| 18 | 1 | Juan Pablo Montoya | Chip Ganassi Racing | 61 | Mechanical | 1 | 59 | 2 |
| 19 | 11 | Christian Fittipaldi | Newman/Haas Racing | 60 | Contact | 8 | 0 | 0 |
| 20 | 26 | Paul Tracy | Team Green | 59 | Disqualified | 19 | 0 | 0 |
| 21 | 40 | Adrián Fernández | Patrick Racing | 31 | Contact | 13 | 0 | 0 |
| 22 | 25 | Luiz Garcia Jr. | Arciero Racing | 25 | Mechanical | 24 | 0 | 0 |
| 23 | 97 | Cristiano da Matta | PPI Motorsports | 14 | Mechanical | 6 | 0 | 0 |
| 24 | 8 | Kenny Bräck | Team Rahal | 10 | Contact | 7 | 0 | 0 |
Source: Racing-Reference

== Standings after the race ==
Drivers' Championship

| Pos | +/– | Driver | Points |
|---|---|---|---|
| 1 | | (Canada) Paul Tracy | 59 |
| 2 | 1 | (United States) Jimmy Vasser | 54 |
| 3 | 1 | (Brazil) Roberto Moreno | 52 |
| 4 | 5 | (Italy) Max Papis | 47 |
| 5 | 1 | (Brazil) Gil de Ferran | 47 |

Constructors' standings

| Pos | +/– | Constructor | Points |
|---|---|---|---|
| 1 | | (United Kingdom) Reynard | 137 |
| 2 | | (United Kingdom) Lola | 107 |
| 3 | | (United States) Swift | 4 |

Manufacturer's Standings

| Pos | +/- | Manufacturer | Points |
|---|---|---|---|
| 1 | | (United Kingdom) Ford-Cosworth | 120 |
| 2 | | (Japan) Honda | 116 |
| 3 | | (Japan) Toyota | 108 |
| 4 | | (Germany) Mercedes | 39 |

| Previous race: 2000 Miller Lite 225 | CART FedEx Championship Series; 2000 season | Next race: 2000 Freightliner/G.I. Joe's 200 |
| Previous race: 1999 ITT Automotive; Detroit Grand Prix | Tenneco Automotive; Grand Prix of Detroit | Next race: 2001 Tenneco Automotive; Grand Prix of Detroit |
