= Helen Bee =

American psychologist and academic

Helen L. Bee
- Born: 1939; Tacoma, Washington
- Occupation: Academic
- Spouse: Carl R. de Boor
- Children: Rex Douglas, Arwen Douglas
- Parent(s): Austin Bee and Susan (nee Emmons)

Helen L. Bee (born 1939) is a psychologist and author of several books on the subject of human development, including both child development and adult development.

== Education ==
Bee was one of the two daughters of Austin Bee, who influenced her deeply. She received her BA from Radcliffe College in 1960 (magna cum laude) and her Ph.D. from Stanford University in 1964, under the tutelage of Robert Sears and Eleanor Maccoby.

== Academic ==
After two years as an assistant professor at Clark University, in Worcester, MA, Bee moved to the University of Washington, where she taught for seven years, receiving tenure during that time. After leaving the university, she turned to writing books full-time. The best known of her books is "The Developing Child", now in its 13th edition. Her own favorite of the several books, however, is "The Journey of Adulthood", which included, for the first time in any such text, a chapter on spiritual development.

== Family ==
Bee married George Douglas and had two children, Rex Douglas and Arwen Douglas, in that marriage. She married Carl R. de Boor, an emeritus professor at the University of Wisconsin–Madison, in 1991. She lives on Orcas Island, in Washington state.

In retirement, she volunteers for a number of non-profit organizations on Orcas Island, including Camp Indralaya and OPAL Community Land Trust.

== Major works ==
- The Developing Child ISBN 0-06-040582-1
- The Journey to Adulthood by Helen Bee and Barbara Bjorklund U.S.A. Prentice Hall. 1999. 0130109533
- Essentials of Child Development and Personality; Helen Bee
- Lifespan Development by Helen Bee and Denise Boyd
- Child and Adolescent Development (9th ed.) Bee, H. (2000). [e-text]. Boston, MA: Pearson Custom Publishing.
