= Star filler =

A star filler (also known as cross filler, splines, separators and crossweb fillers) is a type of plastic insert in Cat 5 and Cat 6 cable which separates the individual stranded pair sets from each other while inside of the cable. It increases the thickness and density of the cable but reduces crosstalk and is commonly used only in higher-performance Cat 6A cable, but is also sometimes seen in Cat 5e. A major reason it isn't used widely in cable in the consumer world is that it is not only typically more expensive than regular cable, but it takes up more room, it is harder to bend, and very difficult to manually crimp compared to Cat cable without the star filler. In the IT world, it is often used in cable that is deployed in noisy environments such as datacenters or machine shops.

== See also ==
- Spacers and standoffs
