= Spline =

Spline may refer to:

== Mathematics ==
- Spline (mathematics), a mathematical function used for interpolation or smoothing
- Spline interpolation, a type of interpolation
- Smoothing spline, a method of smoothing using a spline function

== Devices ==
- Spline (mechanical), a mating feature for rotating elements
- Flat spline, a device to draw curves
- Spline drive, a type of screw drive
- Spline cord, a type of thin rubber cord used to secure a window screen to its frame
- Spline (or star filler), a type of plastic cable filler for CAT cable

== Other ==
- Spline (alien beings), in Stephen Baxter's Xeelee Sequence novels
