= Spacers and standoffs =

Types of mechanical separators

In general, a spacer is a solid material used to separate two parts in an assembly. Spacers can vary in size from microns to centimeters. They can be made of metal, plastic, glass, and other materials. Shapes include flat sheet, cylindrical and spherical.

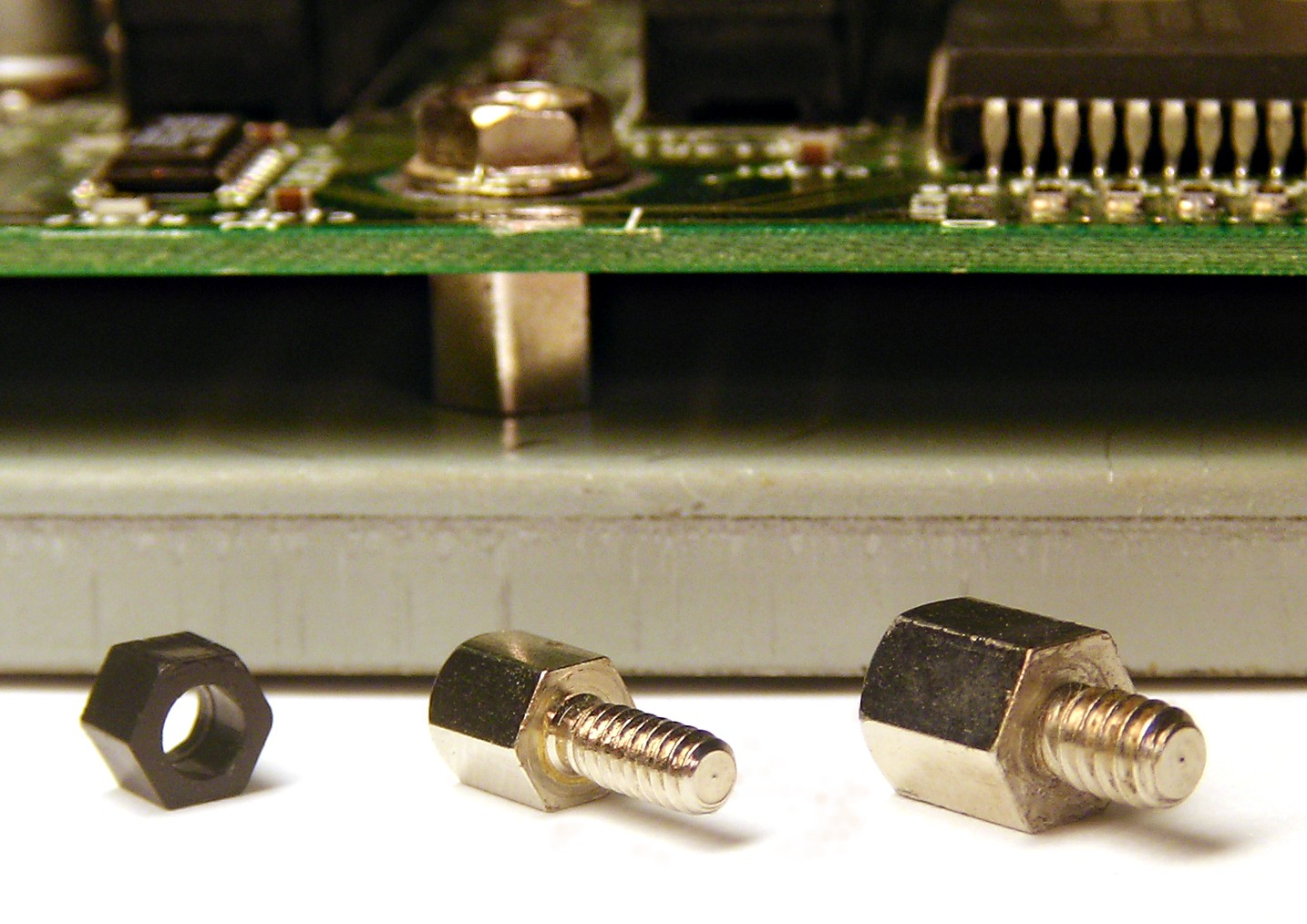
Two sizes of metal standoffs and one plastic standoff. The background depicts a standoff in use, holding a circuit board above a metal case.

A standoff is a threaded separator of defined length used to raise one part in an assembly above another. They are usually round or hex (for wrench tightening), often made of stainless steel, aluminum, brass, or nylon, and come in male-female or female-female forms. In electronics they are frequently used to raise a printed-circuit board above a surface. Insulating standoffs keep two parts from touching each other, thereby preventing electrical shorts. In some cases (e.g., D-subminiature connectors), short standoffs may be used to receive the jackscrews that lock the connection together.

In contrast, some spacers may look similar to standoffs but are unthreaded pieces of tubing which let the entire bolt pass through. Since they cannot be tightened, they are usually round.

Audio visual equipment (e.g., AV amplifiers) can utilise extra space above or below their mounting in order to achieve extra cooling in the way of better airflow. AV spacers are made for this purpose.

== Usage in home computers ==
Size 4-40 is used to receive jackscrews securing cable connectors to external computer ports, and size 6-32 is used for motherboard mounts.

Dell, Inc. refers to standoffs that receive thumbscrews as "hex nut screws" and measures them with the metric system.

== See also ==
- Star filler
- Strut
- Screw
