= Raceway at Belle Isle Park =

IndyCar street circuit in Detroit

- Grand Prix Circuit (1998–2001, 2013–2019, 2021–2022)

- Original Grand Prix Circuit (1992–1997, 2007–2008, 2012)
- Location: Belle Isle Park, Detroit, Michigan, USA
- Coordinates: 42°20′13″N 82°59′56″W
- Opened: 5 June 1992; 33 years ago
- Closed: 5 June 2022; 3 years ago
- Major events: IndyCar Series; Detroit Grand Prix (1992–2001, 2007–2008, 2012–2019, 2021–2022); IMSA SportsCar Championship; Chevrolet Detroit Grand Prix (2007–2008, 2012–2019, 2021–2022); Trans-Am Series; Motor City 100 (1992–2001, 2016–2019); Stadium Super Trucks (2014–2018); Pirelli World Challenge (2001, 2008, 2012–2015)

Grand Prix Circuit (1998–2001, 2013–2019, 2021–2022)
- Length: 2.360 mi (3.798 km)
- Turns: 14
- Race lap record: 1:14.2062 ( (United States) Josef Newgarden, Dallara DW12, 2017, IndyCar)

Original Grand Prix Circuit (1992–1997, 2007–2008, 2012)
- Length: 2.100 mi (3.379 km)
- Turns: 15
- Race lap record: 1:11.461 ( (United Kingdom) Dario Franchitti, Reynard 97I, 1997, CART)

The Raceway at Belle Isle Park was a former street circuit opened in 1992, located in Belle Isle Park in Detroit. The circuit hosted the Detroit Grand Prix in various championships, such as Championship Auto Racing Teams (CART), IndyCar Series, IMSA SportsCar Championship, Rolex Sports Car Series and American Le Mans Series.

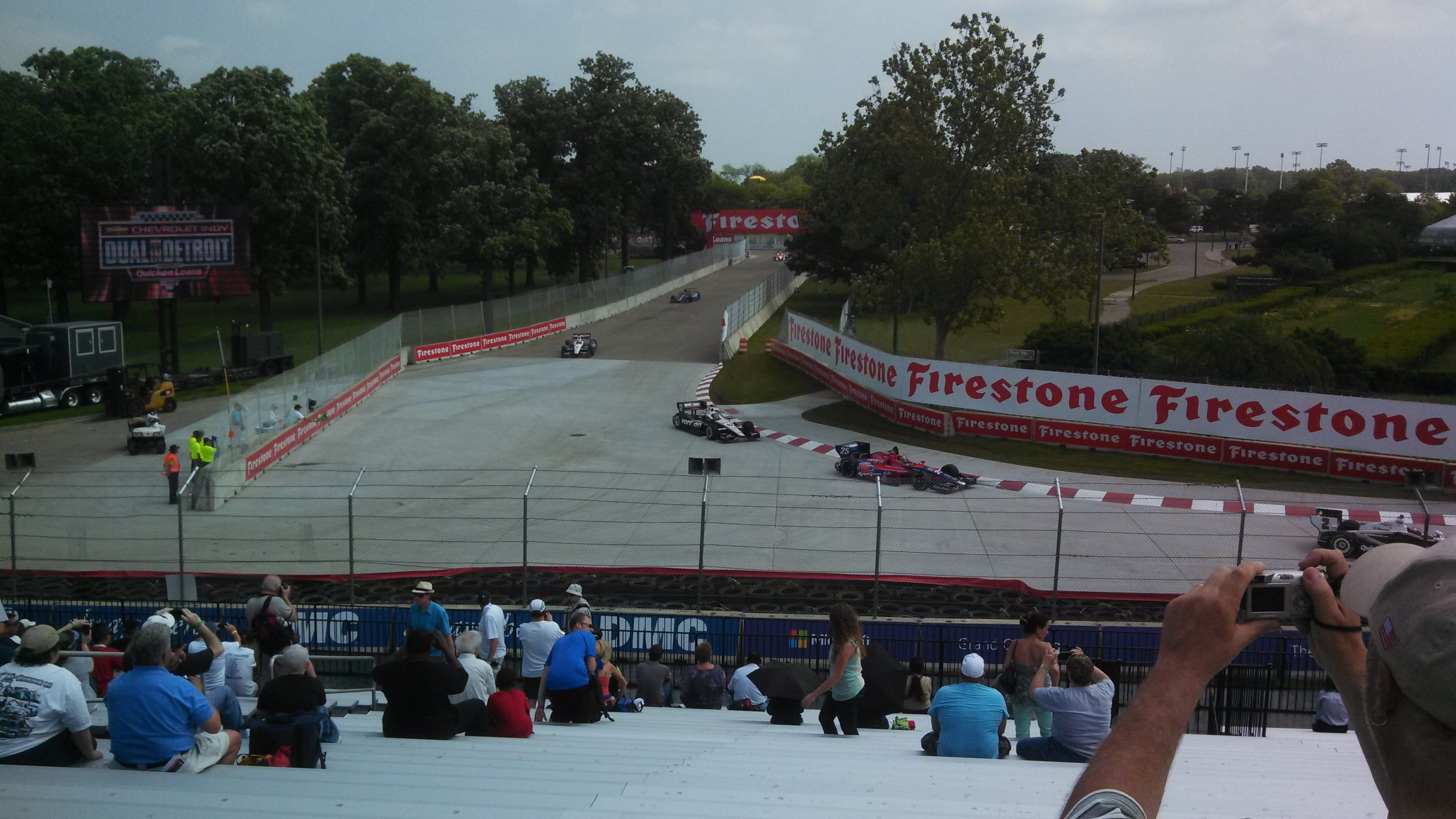
Circuit view from the race in 2013

== History ==
Before 1992, the Detroit Grand Prix races were held on the Detroit street circuit. However, the races were moved to Belle Isle for 30 years except 2002–2006, 2009–2011, and 2020. The races were not held in 2002–2006 due to the contract expiration with CART, not held in 2009–2011 due to the economic crisis in the automotive industry, and not held in 2020 due to the COVID-19 pandemic.

After 2022, the races returned again to the modified layout of Detroit street circuit.

== Lap records ==
The unofficial track record is 1:13.056, set by Juan Pablo Montoya in a Lola B2K/00, during qualifying for the 2000 Tenneco Automotive Grand Prix of Detroit. The fastest official race lap records at the Detroit Belle Isle Street Circuit are listed as:

Category	Time	Driver	Vehicle	Event
Grand Prix Circuit (1998–2001, 2013–2022): 2.360 mi (3.798 km)
IndyCar	1:14.2062	Josef Newgarden	Dallara DW12	2017 Chevrolet Detroit Grand Prix
CART	1:15.701	Juan Pablo Montoya	Reynard 99I	1999 ITT Automotive Detroit Grand Prix
DPi	1:19.932	Filipe Albuquerque	Acura ARX-05	2022 Chevrolet Sports Car Classic
Indy Lights	1:21.4559	David Malukas	Dallara IL-15	2021 Indy Lights Detroit Grand Prix
DP	1:23.138	Dane Cameron	Corvette Daytona Prototype	2016 Chevrolet Sports Car Classic
LMPC	1:24.977	Renger van der Zande	Oreca FLM09	2016 Chevrolet Sports Car Classic
LM GTE	1:27.180	Tommy Milner	Chevrolet Corvette C8.R	2021 Chevrolet Sports Car Classic
GT3	1:28.335	Aaron Telitz	Lexus RC F GT3	2022 Chevrolet Sports Car Classic
Barber Pro	1:31.740	Jeff Simmons	Reynard 98E	1998 Detroit Barber Pro round
TA1	1:32.612	Ernie Francis Jr.	Ford Mustang Trans-Am	2017 Detroit Trans-Am round
TA2	1:35.154	Tony Buffomante	Ford Mustang Trans-Am	2019 Detroit Trans-Am round
Original Grand Prix Circuit (1992–1997, 2007–2012): 2.100 mi (3.379 km)
CART	1:11.461	Dario Franchitti	Reynard 97I	1997 ITT Automotive Detroit Grand Prix
IndyCar	1:12.0651	Justin Wilson	Dallara DW12	2012 Chevrolet Detroit Belle Isle Grand Prix
LMP2	1:14.993	Ryan Briscoe	Porsche RS Spyder Evo	2007 Detroit Sports Car Challenge
LMP1	1:17.091	Marco Werner	Audi R10 TDI	2007 Detroit Sports Car Challenge
Indy Lights	1:17.6393	Gustavo Yacamán	Dallara IPS	2012 Indy Lights Detroit Belle Isle Grand Prix
DP	1:21.552	João Barbosa	Corvette Daytona Prototype	2012 Chevrolet Grand-Am Detroit 200
GT1 (GTS)	1:21.906	Jan Magnussen	Chevrolet Corvette C6.R	2007 Detroit Sports Car Challenge
Trans-Am	1:24.381	Tommy Kendall	Ford Mustang Trans-Am	1997 Detroit Trans-Am round
GT2	1:25.082	Dirk Müller	Ferrari F430 GTC	2008 Detroit Sports Car Challenge
Super Touring	1:30.380	Neil Crompton	Honda Accord	1997 Detroit NATCC round
