= Biorthogonal wavelet =

Type of oscillation

A Biorthogonal wavelet is a wavelet where the associated wavelet transform is invertible but not necessarily orthogonal. Designing biorthogonal wavelets allows more degrees of freedom than orthogonal wavelets. One additional degree of freedom is the possibility to construct symmetric wavelet functions.

In the biorthogonal case, there are two scaling functions $\phi,\tilde\phi$, which may generate different multiresolution analyses, and accordingly two different wavelet functions $\psi,\tilde\psi$. So the numbers M and N of coefficients in the scaling sequences $a,\tilde a$ may differ. The scaling sequences must satisfy the following biorthogonality condition

$$\sum_{n\in\Z} a_n \tilde a_{n+2m}=2\cdot\delta_{m,0}$$.

Then the wavelet sequences can be determined as
$b_n=(-1)^n \tilde a_{M-1-n} \quad \quad (n=0,\dots,N-1)$
$\tilde b_n=(-1)^n a_{M-1-n} \quad \quad (n=0,\dots,N-1)$.
