= Richard Baraniuk =

American electrical engineer and academic

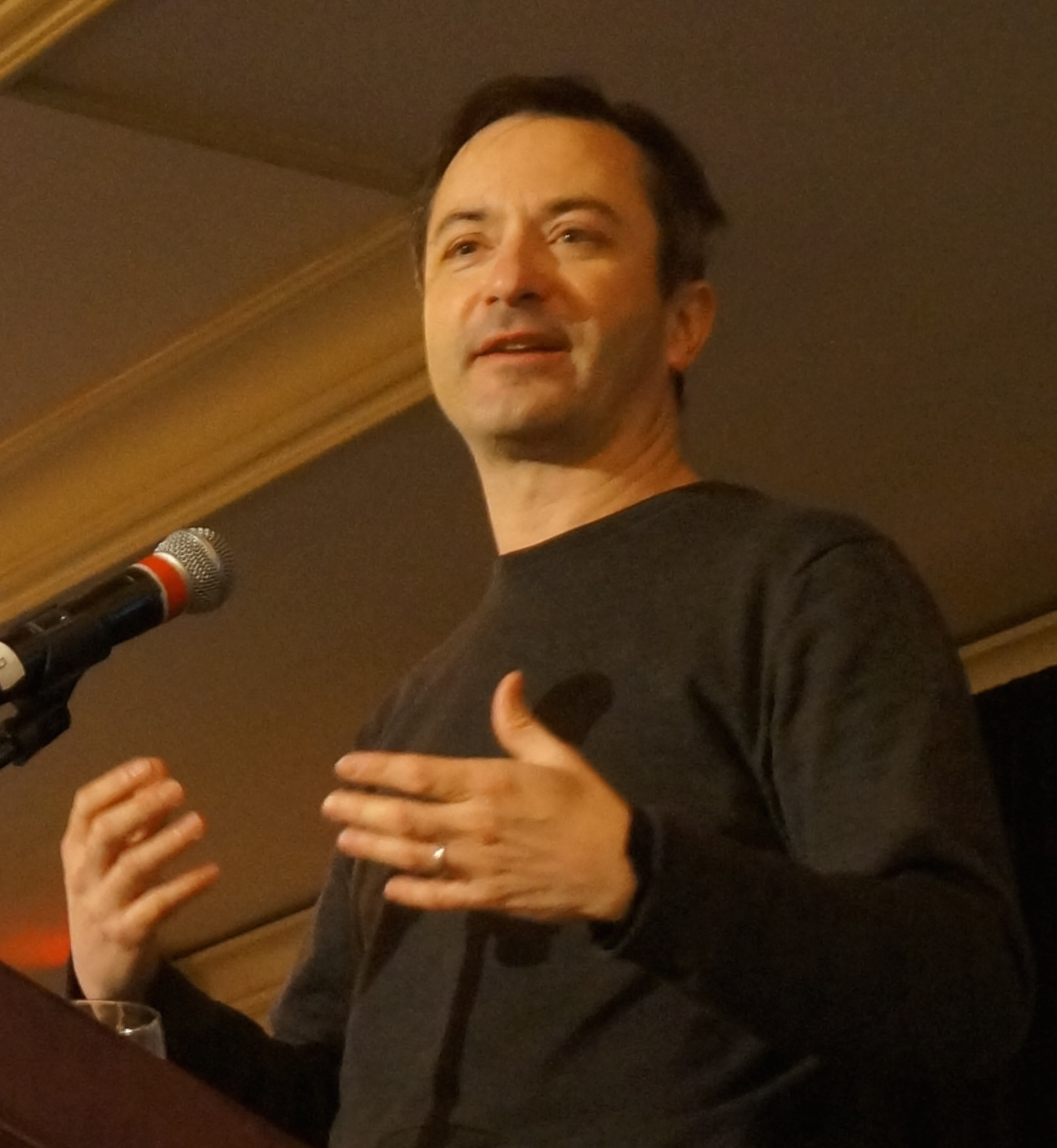
- Baraniuk at the SPARC 2014 conference
- Education: University of Illinois at Urbana–Champaign (1992); University of Wisconsin-Madison (1988); University of Manitoba (1987)
- Known for: Wavelet theory, Compressive sensing, Sparse approximation, Machine learning, Deep learning, Open educational resources
- Awards: ONR Young Investigator Award (1994) NSF National Young Investigator Award (1995); Rosenbaum Fellowship, Isaac Newton Institute (Cambridge University) (1998); C. Holmes MacDonald National Outstanding Teaching Award (IEEE, Eta Kappa Nu) (1999); University of Illinois ECE Young Alumni Achievement Award (2000); Fellow of the IEEE (2001); Edutopia Magazine Daring Dozen educator (2007); Wavelet Pioneer Award from SPIE (2008); Internet Pioneer Award from Berkman Center for Internet & Society (2008); Fellow of the American Association for the Advancement of Science (2009); IEEE Signal Processing Society Education Award (2010); WISE Education Award (2011); SPIE Compressive Sampling Pioneer Award (2012); Thomson Reuters Highly Cited Researcher (2014--2020); IEEE Signal Processing Society Technical Achievement Award (2014); IEEE James H. Mulligan, Jr. Education Medal (2015); Fellow of the National Academy of Inventors (2016); Vannevar Bush Fellow (NSSEFF, 2017); Member of the American Academy of Arts and Sciences (2017); IEEE Signal Processing Society Magazine Best Paper Award (2021); Harold W. McGraw Prize in Education (2021); Member of the National Academy of Engineering (2022); AMS Josiah Willard Gibbs Lectureship (2023) IEEE Jack S. Kilby Signal Processing Medal (2025)
- Scientific career
- Fields: Electrical engineer, Mathematician
- Workplaces: Rice University
- Doctoral advisor: Douglas L. Jones
- Other academic advisors: Patrick Flandrin (postdoc)

Richard Gordon Baraniuk is the C. Sidney Burrus Professor of Electrical and Computer Engineering at Rice University, the founder and Director of the open education initiative OpenStax (formerly called Connexions), and the founder and Director of the learning science and education research infrastructure SafeInsights.

== Academic biography ==
Dr. Baraniuk received a B.Sc. from the University of Manitoba in 1987 and a M.Sc. from the University of Wisconsin-Madison in 1988. He earned a Ph.D. in electrical engineering at the University of Illinois at Urbana-Champaign in 1992 under the supervision of Douglas L. Jones. After spending 1992-1993 at École normale supérieure de Lyon, France working with Patrick Flandrin, he joined Rice University.

== Research ==
Baraniuk has been active in the development of digital signal processing, image processing, and machine learning systems, with numerous contributions to the theory of wavelets, compressive sensing, and deep learning. The Rice "single-pixel camera" that he developed with Kevin Kelly was the first compressive imaging device and was selected by MIT Technology Review as a TR10 Top 10 Emerging Technology in 2007. Six of Baraniuk's over 35 patents were licensed by Siemens for applications in magnetic resonance imaging (MRI) scans. He has served as Project Director for the ARO MURI on "Opportunistic Sensing" from 2013-2018, the ONR MURI on "Foundations of Deep Learning" from 2020-2025, the DOE "INCITE" project, and several DARPA projects, including "Analog to Information" and "Analog to Information Receiver".

== Open education, Connexions, and OpenStax ==
Baraniuk is one of the founders of the Open Education movement. In 1999, Baraniuk launched "Connexions" (which was later re-named "OpenStax CNX"), one of the first initiatives to offer free, open-source textbooks via the web. OpenStax CNX continues to be one of the largest and most used open education platforms worldwide. As of September 2018, Baraniuk's own OpenStax CNX textbook, "Signals and Systems," has generated 9 million page views including a very popular translation into Spanish.

OpenStax CNX provides the digital publishing platform for OpenStax (formerly called "OpenStax College"), a free and open library of college textbooks that as of May 2021 has saved 20 million US college students $1.7 billion.

Baraniuk has been an active advocate and popularizer of open education – speaking at the TED 2006 conference – and was also one of the framers of the Cape Town Open Education Declaration.

== Awards and honors ==
Baraniuk has received numerous awards, including a NATO postdoctoral fellowship from NSERC in 1992, the National Young Investigator award from the National Science Foundation in 1994, a Young Investigator Award from the Office of Naval Research in 1995, the Rosenbaum Fellowship from the Isaac Newton Institute of Cambridge University in 1998, the University of Illinois at Urbana–Champaign ECE Young Alumni Achievement Award in 2000, and the Wavelet Pioneer Award from SPIE in 2008. He also received the 2012 Compressive Sampling Pioneer award from SPIE for his work on compressive sensing and the 2014 Technical Achievement Award from IEEE Signal Processing Society. He was selected as a DOD Vannevar Bush Fellow (formerly National Security Science and Engineering Faculty Fellow) in 2017.

OpenStax CNX (then called "Connexions") received the Tech Museum Laureate Award from the Tech Museum of Innovation in 2006, and Baraniuk was selected as one of Edutopia Magazine's Daring Dozen educators in 2007. In 2008, Baraniuk received the Internet Pioneer Award from Berkman Center for Internet & Society, and in 2010 he received the IEEE Signal Processing Society Education Award. In 2011 he received the WISE Education Award from the Qatar Foundation. In 2015 he was awarded the IEEE James H. Mulligan, Jr. Education Medal. In 2021, he was awarded the Harold W. McGraw Prize in Education.

Baraniuk was elected a Fellow of the IEEE in 2001, a Fellow of the American Association for the Advancement of Science in 2009, a Fellow of the National Academy of Inventors in 2016, a Member of the American Academy of Arts and Sciences in 2017, and a Member of the National Academy of Engineering in 2022. In 2025, he was awarded the IEEE Jack S. Kilby Signal Processing Medal.
