= Łukasz Albrecht =

- Born: 5 September 1980 (age 46); Łódź
- Occupations: Vice-Rector for Science, Łódź University of Technology
- Title: Professor, D.Sc., Eng., Professor of Exact and Natural Sciences

Academic background
- Education: Łódź University of Technology (Ph.D.: 2009, Habilitation: 2015, Chemical Sciences) Professorship: 2019

Academic work
- Discipline: Organic chemistry, asymmetric catalysis, organocatalysis
- Institutions: Łódź University of Technology

Łukasz Karol Albrecht (born 5 September 1980 in Łódź) – is a Polish professor of exact and natural sciences. He specializes in asymmetric catalysis and in the synthesis and application of organic catalysts with precisely defined spatial structures. Professionally affiliated with Łódź University of Technology, he has served since 2020 as the university's Vice-Rector for Science. He is also the Director of the Institute of Organic Chemistry at Łódź University of Technology.

== Career ==
In 2004, he completed a master's degree in the chemistry of biologically important compounds under an individual course of study. In 2009, he defended his doctoral dissertation with distinction and obtained a Ph.D. in Chemical Sciences. For his dissertation, he received the Prime Minister's Award and, in 2010, the Sigma-Aldrich Award and the award of the Polish Chemical Society.

After earning his doctoral degree, he became a fellow of the KOLUMB Program of the Foundation for Polish Science. He subsequently completed a postdoctoral fellowship of more than three years at Aarhus University in Denmark.

In 2015, he obtained the degree of Doctor of Science (habilitation) in Chemical Sciences, and in 2019 he was awarded the title of Professor of Exact and Natural Sciences. In 2020, he assumed the position of Vice-Rector for Science at Łódź University of Technology. He continues to serve in this role during the 2024–2028 term.

== Research ==
He heads the Asymmetric Catalysis Research Group at the Institute of Organic Chemistry of Łódź University of Technology. The group's research focuses on stereocontrolled organic synthesis, organocatalysis, and the mechanisms of catalytic reactions.

Together with Anna Albrecht and Luca Dell’Amico, he co-edited the two-volume publication Asymmetric Organocatalysis: New Strategies, Catalysts, and Opportunities, published by Wiley-VCH.

== Organizational activity ==
- In 2024, he was elected vice-chair of the Chemistry Committee of the Polish Academy of Sciences for the 2024–2028 term.
- He serves as vice-chair of the College of Vice-Rectors for Research and Development of public technical universities.
- In 2024, he was appointed to the supervisory board of EIT Health InnoStars, where he represents the Polish partners of EIT Health.
- For the years 2026–2027, he was elected as Poland's National Representative in the Organic and Biomolecular Chemistry Division of the International Union of Purend Applied Chemistry (IUPAC).

== Awards and honors ==
- 2010 – Prime Minister's Award for the best doctoral dissertation of 2009.
- 2010 – Award of the Polish Chemical Society and Sigma-Aldrich for the best doctoral dissertation in organic chemistry of 2009.
- 2014 – Finalist of the 14th edition of the Polityka Scientific Awards.
- 2014 – Professor Mieczysław Mąkosza Scientific Award.
- 2016 – Young Scientist Medal of Warsaw University of Technology.
- 2016 – Professor Włodzimierz Kołos Scientific Award of Division III of the Polish Academy of Sciences.
- 2022 – Stanisław Kostanecki Medal of the Polish Chemical Society.
