= Multidimensional empirical mode decomposition =

Signal processing algorithm

In signal processing, multidimensional empirical mode decomposition (multidimensional EMD) is an extension of the one-dimensional (1-D) EMD algorithm to a signal encompassing multiple dimensions. The Hilbert–Huang empirical mode decomposition (EMD) process decomposes a signal into intrinsic mode functions combined with the Hilbert spectral analysis, known as the Hilbert–Huang transform (HHT). The multidimensional EMD extends the 1-D EMD algorithm into multiple-dimensional signals. This decomposition can be applied to image processing, audio signal processing, and various other multidimensional signals.

== Motivation ==
Multidimensional empirical mode decomposition is a popular method because of its applications in many fields, such as texture analysis, financial applications, image processing, ocean engineering, seismic research, etc. Several methods of Empirical Mode Decomposition have been used to analyze characterization of multidimensional signals.

== Introduction to empirical mode decomposition (EMD) ==
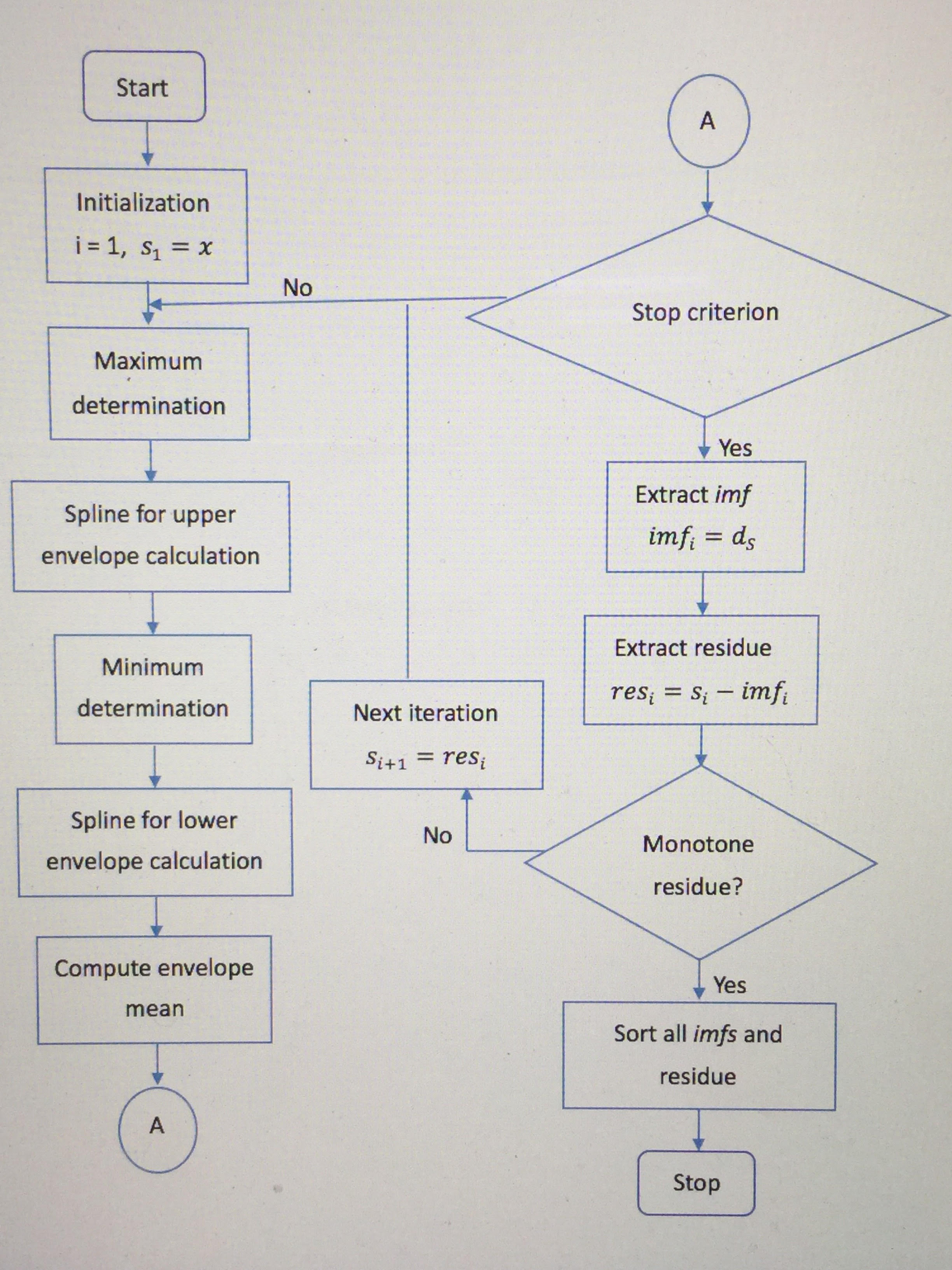
Flow chart of basic EMD algorithm

The empirical mode decomposition (EMD) method can extract global structure and deal with fractal-like signals.

The EMD method was developed so that data can be examined in an adaptive time–frequency–amplitude space for nonlinear and non-stationary signals.

The EMD method decomposes the input signal into several intrinsic mode functions (IMF) and a residue. The given equation will be as follows:

$$I(n)=\sum_{m=1}^M \operatorname{IMF}_m(n)+\operatorname{Res}_M(n)$$

where $I(n)$ is the multi-component signal. $\operatorname{IMF}_m(n)$ is the $M^\text{th}$ intrinsic mode function, and $\operatorname{Res}_M(n)$ represents the residue corresponding to $M$ intrinsic modes.

== Ensemble empirical mode decomposition ==
The ensemble mean is an approach to improving the accuracy of measurements. Data is collected by separate observations, each of which contains different noise over an ensemble of universes. To generalize this ensemble idea, noise is introduced to the single data set, $x(t)$, as if separate observations were indeed being made as an analogue to a physical experiment that could be repeated many times. The added white noise is treated as the possible random noise that would be encountered in the measurement process. Under such conditions, the artificial ‘observation’ will be $x_i(t)=x(t)+w_i(t)$.

In the case of only one observation, one of the multiple-observation ensembles is mimicked by adding different copies of white noise, $w_i(t)$, to that single observation as given in the equation. Although adding noise may result in a smaller signal-to-noise ratio, the added white noise will provide a uniform reference scale distribution to facilitate EMD; therefore, the low signal-noise ratio will not affect the decomposition method but actually enhances it by avoiding mode mixing. Based on this argument, an additional step is taken by arguing that adding white noise may help extract the true signals in the data, a method that is termed Ensemble Empirical Mode Decomposition (EEMD).

The EEMD consists of the following steps:

1. Adding a white noise series to the original data.
2. Decomposing the data with added white noise into oscillatory components.
3. Repeating step 1 and step 2 again and again, but with a different white noise series added each time.
4. Obtaining the ensemble mean of the corresponding intrinsic mode functions of the decomposition as the final result.

In these steps, EEMD uses two properties of white noise:

1. The added white noise leads to a relatively even distribution of extrema distribution on all timescales.
2. The dyadic filter bank property provides a control on the periods of oscillations contained in an oscillatory component, significantly reducing the chance of scale mixing in a component. Through ensemble average, the added noise is averaged out.

=== Pseudo-bi-dimensional empirical mode decomposition ===
The “pseudo-BEMD” method is not limited to one-spatial dimension; rather, it can be applied to data of any number of spatial-temporal dimensions. Since the spatial structure is essentially determined by timescales of the variability of a physical quantity at each location and the decomposition is completely based on the characteristics of individual time series at each spatial location, there is no assumption of spatial coherent structures of this physical quantity. When a coherent spatial structure emerges, it better reflects the physical processes that drive the evolution of the physical quantity on the timescale of each component. Therefore, we expect this method to have significant applications in spatial-temporal data analysis.

To design a pseudo-BEMD algorithm the key step is to translate the algorithm of the 1D EMD into a Bi-dimensional Empirical Mode Decomposition (BEMD) and further extend the algorithm to three or more dimensions which is similar to the BEMD by extending the procedure on successive dimensions. For a 3D data cube of $i \times j \times k$ elements, the pseudo-BEMD will yield detailed 3D components of $m \times n \times q$ where $m$, $n$ and $q$ are the number of the IMFs decomposed from each dimension having $i$, $j$, and $k$ elements, respectively.

Mathematically let us represent a 2D signal in the form of $i\times j$ matrix form with a finite number of elements.

$$X(i,j)
=
\begin{bmatrix}x(1,1) & x(1,2) & \cdots & x(1,j)  \\x(2,1) & x(2,2) & \cdots & x(1,j)  \\ \vdots & \vdots & & \vdots \\x(i,1) & x(i,2) & \cdots & x(i,j)  \end{bmatrix}$$

At first we perform EMD in one direction of X(i, j), Row wise for instance, to decompose the data of each row into m components, then to collect the components of the same level of m from the result of each row decomposition to make a 2D decomposed signal at that level of m. Therefore, m set of 2D spatial data are obtained

$$\begin{align}
RX(1,i,j) & = \begin{bmatrix}x(1,1,1) & x(1,1,2) & \cdots & x(1,1,j)  \\x(1,2,1) & x(1,2,2) & \cdots & x(1,2,j)  \\  \vdots & \vdots & & \vdots \\x(1,i,1) & x(1,i,2) & \cdots & x(1,i,j)  \end{bmatrix} \\[6pt]
RX(2,i,j) & = \begin{bmatrix}x(2,1,1) & x(2,1,2) & \cdots & x(2,1,j)  \\x(2,2,1) & x(2,2,2) & \cdots & x(2,2,j)  \\ \vdots & \vdots & & \vdots \\ x(2,i,1) & x(2,i,2) & \cdots & x(2,i,j) \end{bmatrix} \\
\vdots \qquad & \,\,\,\vdots \qquad \vdots \\[6pt]
RX(m,i,j) & = \begin{bmatrix}x(m,1,1) & x(m,1,2) & \cdots & x(m,1,j)  \\x(m,2,1) & x(m,2,2) & \cdots & x(m,2,j)  \\ \vdots & \vdots & & \vdots \\x(m,i,1) & x(m,i,2) & \cdots & x(m,i,j)  \end{bmatrix}
\end{align}$$

where RX (1, i, j), RX (2, i, j), and RX (m, i, j) are the m sets of signal as stated (also here we use R to indicate row decomposing). The relation between these m 2D decomposed signals and the original signal is given as $X(i,j)=\sum_{ k \mathop =1}^mRX(k,i,j)$.

The first row of the matrix RX (m, i, j) is the mth EMD component decomposed from the first row of the matrix X (i, j). The second row of the matrix RX (m, i, j) is the mth EMD component decomposed from the second row of the matrix X (i, j), and so on.

Suppose that the previous decomposition is along the horizontal direction, the next step is to decompose each one of the previously row decomposed components RX(m, i, j), in the vertical direction into n components. This step will generate n components from each RX component.

For example, the component

1. RX(1,i,j) will be decomposed into CRX(1,1,i,j), CRX(1,2,i,j),...,CRX(1,n,i,j)
2. RX(2,i,j) will be decomposed into CRX(2,1,i,j), CRX(2,2,i,j),..., CRX(2,n,i,j)
3. RX(m,i,j) will be decomposed into CRX(m,1,i,j), CRX(m,2,i,j),..., CRX(m,n,i,j)

where C means column decomposing. Finally, the 2D decomposition will result into m× n matrices which are the 2D EMD components of the original data X(i,j). The matrix expression for the result of the 2D decomposition is

$$CRX(m,n,i,j)
=
\begin{bmatrix}crx(1,1,i,j) & crx(2,1,i,j) & \cdots & crx(m,1,i,j)  \\crx(1,2,i,j) & crx(2,2,i,j) & \cdots & crx(m,2,i,j)  \\ \vdots & \vdots & & \vdots \\crx(1,n,i,j) & crx(2,n,i,j) & \cdots & crx(m,n,i,j)  \end{bmatrix}$$

where each element in the matrix CRX is an i × j sub-matrix representing a 2D EMD decomposed component. We use the arguments (or suffixes) m and n to represent the component number of row decomposition and column decomposition, respectively rather than the subscripts indicating the row and the column of a matrix. Notice that the m and n indicate the number of components resulting from row (horizontal) decomposition and then column (vertical) decomposition, respectively.

By combining the components of the same scale or the comparable scales with minimal difference will yield a 2D feature with best physical significance. The components of the first row and the first column are approximately the same or comparable scale although their scales are increasing gradually along the row or column. Therefore, combining the components of the first row and the first column will obtain the first complete 2D component (C2D1). The subsequent process is to perform the same combination technique to the rest of the components, the contribution of the noises are distributed to the separate component according to their scales. As a result, the coherent structures of the components emerge, In this way, the pseudo-BEMD method can be applied to reveal the evolution of spatial structures of data.

$C2D_L=\sum_{k=1}^mcrx_{k,l}+\sum_{k=l+1}^ncrx_{l,k}$

Following the convention of 1D EMD, the last component of the complete 2D components is called residue.

The decomposition scheme proposed here could be extended to data of any dimensions such as data of a solid with different density or other measurable properties

given as $I=f(x_1,x_2,x_3,x_4,\ldots,x_n)$

In which the subscription, n, indicated the number of dimensions. The procedure is identical as stated above: the decomposition starts with the first dimension, and proceeds to the second and third until all the dimensions are exhausted. The decomposition is still implemented by slices. This new approach is based on separating the original data into one-dimensional slices, then applying ensemble EMD to each one-dimensional slice. The key part of the method is in the construction of the IMF according to the principle of combination of the comparable minimal scale components.

For example, the matrix expression for the result of a 3D decomposition is TCRX(m,n,q,i,j,k) where T denotes the depth (or time) decomposition. Based on the comparable minimal scale combination principle as applied in the 2D case, the number of complete 3D components will be the smallest value of m, n, and q. The general equation for deriving 3D components is

$C3D_L = \sum_{m=l}^m \sum_{n=\ell}^ntcrx_{m,n,\ell} + \sum_{m=\ell+1}^m \sum_{q=\ell+1}^n tcrx_{m,\ell,q} + \sum_{n=\ell+1}^m \sum_{q=\ell+1}^m tcrx_{\ell,n,q}$

where ℓ denotes the level of the C3D i.e.

$$\begin{cases}
\ell=m=n & \text{if } m=n; \\
\ell=m & \text{if } m<n; \\
\ell=n & \text{if } m>n.
\end{cases}$$

The pseudo-BEMD method has several advantages. For instance, the sifting procedure of the pseudo-BEMD is a combination of one dimensional sifting. It employs 1D curve fitting in the sifting process of each dimension, and has no difficulty as encountered in the 2D EMD algorithms using surface fitting, which has the problem of determining the saddle point as a local maximum or minimum. Sifting is the process which separates the IMF and repeats the process until the residue is obtained. The first step of performing sifting is to determine the upper and lower envelopes encompassing all the data by using the spline method. Sifting scheme for pseudo-BEMD is like the 1D sifting where the local mean of the standard EMD is replaced by the mean of multivariate envelope curves.

The major disadvantage of this method is that although we could extend this algorithm to any dimensional data we only use it for Two dimension applications. Because the computation time of higher dimensional data would be proportional to the number of IMF's of the succeeding dimensions. Hence, it could exceed the computation capacity for a Geo-Physical data processing system when the number of EMD in the algorithm is large. Hence, we have mentioned below faster and better techniques to tackle this disadvantage.

=== Multi-dimensional ensemble empirical mode decomposition ===
A Fast and efficient data analysis is very important for large sequences hence the MDEEMD focuses on two important things

1. Data compression which involves decomposing data into simpler forms.
2. EEMD on the compressed data; this is the most challenging since on decomposing the compressed data there is a high probability to lose key information. A data compression method that uses principal component analysis (PCA)/empirical orthogonal function (EOF) analysis or principal oscillation pattern analysis is used to compress data.

==== Principal component analysis (PCA) or empirical orthogonal function analysis (EOF) ====
The principal component analysis/empirical orthogonal function analysis (PCA/EOF) has been widely used in data analysis and image compression, its main objective is to reduce a data set containing a large number of variables to a data set containing fewer variables, but that still represents a large fraction of the variability contained in the original data set. In climate studies, EOF analysis is often used to study possible spatial modes (i.e., patterns) of variability and how they change with time . In statistics, EOF analysis is known as principal component analysis (PCA).

Typically, the EOFs are found by computing the eigenvalues and eigen vectors of a spatially weighted anomaly covariance matrix of a field. Most commonly, the spatial weights are the cos(latitude) or, better for EOF analysis, the sqrt(cos(latitude)). The derived eigenvalues provide a measure of the percent variance explained by each mode. Unfortunately, the eigenvalues are not necessarily distinct due to sampling issues. North et al. (Mon. Wea. Rev., 1982, eqns 24–26) provide a 'rule of thumb' for determining if a particular eigenvalue (mode) is distinct from its nearest neighbor.

Atmospheric and oceanographic processes are typically 'red' which means that most of the variance (power) is contained within the first few modes. The time series of each mode (aka, principle components) are determined by projecting the derived eigen vectors onto the spatially weighted anomalies. This will result in the amplitude of each mode over the period of record.

By construction, the EOF patterns and the principal components are independent. Two factors inhibit physical interpretation of EOFs: (i) The orthogonality constraint and (ii) the derived patterns may be domain dependent. Physical systems are not necessarily orthogonal and if the patterns depend on the region used they may not exist if the domain changes.

==== Spatial-temporal signal using multi-dimensional ensemble empirical mode decomposition ====
Assume, we have a spatio-temporal data $T(s,t)$, where $s$ is spatial locations (not necessary one dimensional originally but needed to be rearranged into a single spatial dimension) from 1 to $N$ and $t$ temporal locations from 1 to $M$.

Using PCA/EOF, one can express $T(s,t)$ into $T(s,t)=\sum_{i=1}^K Y_i(t)V_i(t)$

where $Y_i (t)$ is the $i$th principal component and $Y_i (t)$ the $i$th empirical orthogonal function (EOF) pattern and K is the smaller one of M and N. PC and EOFs are often obtained by solving the eigenvalue/eigenvector problem of either temporal co-variance matrix or spatial co-variance matrix based on which dimension is smaller. The variance explained by one pair of PCA/EOF is its corresponding eigenvalue divided by the sum of all eigenvalues of the co-variance matrix.

If the data subjected to PCA/EOF analysis is all white noise, all eigenvalues are theoretically equal and there is no preferred vector direction for the principal component in PCA/EOF space. To retain most of the information of the data, one needs to retain almost all the PC's and EOF's, making the size of PCA/EOF expression even larger than that of the original but If the original data contain only one spatial structure and oscillate with time, then the original data can be expressed as the product of one PC and one EOF, implying that the original data of large size can be expressed by small size data without losing information, i.e. highly compressible.

The variability of a smaller region tends to be more spatio-temporally coherent than that of a bigger region containing that smaller region, and, therefore, it is expected that fewer PC/EOF components are required to account for a threshold level of variance hence one way to improve the efficiency of the representation of data in terms of PC/EOF component is to divide the global spatial domain into a set of sub-regions. If we divide the original global spatial domain into n sub-regions containing N1, N2, . . . , Nn spatial grids, respectively, with all Ni, where i=1, . . . , n, greater than M, where M denotes the number of temporal locations, we anticipate that the numbers of the retained PC/EOF pairs for all sub-regions K1, K2, . . . , Kn are all smaller than K, the total number of data values in PCA/EOF representation of the original data of the global spatial domain by the equation given up is K×(N+M). For the new approach of using spatial division, the total number of values in PCA/EOF representation is

$$\sum_{i=1}^nK_i(M+N_i)=K'_iN+M\sum_{i=1}^nK_i$$

where

$K'_i=\frac{\sum_{i=1}^nK_iN_i}{N}.$

Therefore, the compression rate of the spatial domain is as follows

$\text{Compression rate} =\frac{NM}{NK'_i+M \sum_{i=1}^nK_i}$

The advantage of this algorithm is that an optimized division and an optimized selection of PC/EOF pairs for each region would lead to a higher rate of compression and result into significantly lower computation as compared to a Pseudo BEMD extended to higher dimensions.

=== Fast multidimensional ensemble empirical mode decomposition ===
For a temporal signal of length M, the complexity of cubic spline sifting through its local extrema is about the order of M, and so is that of the EEMD as it only repeats the spline fitting operation with a number that is not dependent on M. However, as the sifting number (often selected as 10) and the ensemble number (often a few hundred) multiply to the spline sifting operations, hence the EEMD is time-consuming compared with many other time series analysis methods such as Fourier transforms and wavelet transforms. The MEEMD employs EEMD decomposition of the time series at each division grids of the initial temporal signal, the EEMD operation is repeated by the number of total grid points of the domain. The idea of the fast MEEMD is very simple. As PCA/EOF-based compression expressed the original data in terms of pairs of PCs and EOFs, through decomposing PCs, instead of time series of each grid, and using the corresponding spatial structure depicted by the corresponding EOFs, the computational burden can be significantly reduced.

The fast MEEMD includes the following steps:

1. All pairs of EOF's, V_{i}, and their corresponding PCs, Y_{i}, of spatio-temporal data over a compressed sub-domain are computed.
2. The number of pairs of PC/EOF that are retained in the compressed data is determined by the calculation of the accumulated total variance of leading EOF/PC pairs.
3. Each PC Y_{i} is decomposed using EEMD, i.e.

$Y_i=\sum_{j=1}^nc_{j,i}+r_{n,i}$

where c_{j,i} represents simple oscillatory modes of certain frequencies and r_{n,i} is the residual of the data Y_{i}. The result of the ith MEEMD component C_{j} is obtained as

$C_j=\sum_{j=1}^{40} c_{j,i} V_i.$

In this compressed computation, we have used the approximate dyadic filter bank properties of EMD/EEMD.

Note that a detailed knowledge of the intrinsic mode functions of a noise corrupted signal can help in estimating the significance of that mode. It is usually assumed that the first IMF captures most of the noise and hence from this IMF we could estimate the Noise level and estimate the noise corrupted signal eliminating the effects of noise approximately. This method is known as denoising and detrending. Another advantage of using the MEEMD is that the mode mixing is reduced significantly due to the function of the EEMD.
The denoising and detrending strategy can be used for image processing to enhance an image and similarly it could be applied to Audio Signals to remove corrupted data in speech. The MDEEMD could be used to break down images and audio signals into IMF and based on the knowledge of the IMF perform necessary operations. The decomposition of an image is very advantageous for radar-based application the decomposition of an image could reveal land mines etc.

== Parallel implementation of multi-dimensional ensemble empirical mode decomposition. ==
In MEEMD, although ample parallelism potentially exists in the ensemble dimensions and/or the non-operating dimensions, several challenges still face a high performance MEEMD implementation.

Bi-Dimensional EMD corrupted with Noise

1. Dynamic data variations: In EEMD, white noises change the number of extrema causing some irregularity and load imbalance, and thus slowing down the parallel execution.
2. Stride memory accesses of high-dimensional data: High dimensional data are stored in non-continuous memory locations. Accesses along high dimensions are thus strided and uncoalesced, wasting available memory bandwidth.
3. Limited resources to harness parallelism: While the independent EMDs and/or EEMDs comprising an MEEMD provide high parallelism, the computational capacities of multi-core and many-core processors may not be sufficient to fully exploit the inherent parallelism of MEEMD. Moreover, increased parallelism may increase memory requirements beyond the memory capacities of these processors.

Bi-Dimensional EMD Intrinsic mode function along with the residue eliminating the noise level.

In MEEMD, when a high degree of parallelism is given by the ensemble dimension and/or the non-operating dimensions, the benefits of using a thread-level parallel algorithm are threefold.

1. It can exploit more parallelism than a block-level parallel algorithm.
2. It does not incur any communication or synchronization between the threads until the results are merged since the execution of each EMD or EEMD is independent.
3. Its implementation is like the sequential one, which makes it more straightforward.

=== OpenMP implementation ===
The EEMDs comprising MEEMD are assigned to independent threads for parallel execution, relying on the OpenMP runtime to resolve any load imbalance issues. Stride memory accesses of high-dimensional data are eliminated by transposing these data to lower dimensions, resulting in better utilization of cache lines. The partial results of each EEMD are made thread-private for correct functionality. Memory requirements depend on the number of OpenMP threads and are managed by OpenMP runtime.

=== CUDA implementation ===
In the GPU CUDA implementation, each EMD, is mapped to a thread. The memory layout, especially of high-dimensional data, is rearranged to meet memory coalescing requirements and fit into the 128-byte cache lines. The data is first loaded along the lowest dimension and then consumed along a higher dimension. This step is performed when the Gaussian noise is added to form the ensemble data. In the new memory layout, the ensemble dimension is added to the lowest dimension to reduce possible branch divergence. The impact of the unavoidable branch divergence from data irregularity, caused by the noise, is minimized via a regularization technique using the on-chip memory. Moreover, the cache memory is utilized to amortize unavoidable uncoalesced memory accesses.

== Fast and adaptive multidimensional empirical mode decomposition ==
=== Concept ===
The fast and adaptive bidimensional empirical mode decomposition (FABEMD) is an improved version of traditional BEMD. The FABEMD can be used in many areas, including medical image analysis, texture analysis and so on. The order statistics filter can help in solving the problems of efficiency and restriction of size in BEMD.

Based on the algorithm of BEMD, the implementation method of FABEMD is really similar to BEMD, but the FABEMD approach just changes the interpolation step into a direct envelope estimation method and restricts the number of iterations for every BIMF to one. As a result, two order statistics, including MAX and MIN, will be used for approximating the upper and lower envelope. The size of the filter will depend on the maxima and minima maps obtained from the input. The steps of the FABEMD algorithm are listed below.

=== FABEMD algorithm ===
Step 1 – Determine and detect local maximum and minimum

As the traditional BEMD approach, we can find the jth ITS-BIMF $F_{Tj}$ of any source of input $S_{i}$ by neighboring window method. For FABEMD approach, we choose a different implementation approach.

From the input data, we can get an 2D matrix represent

$A = \left( \begin{array}{*{20}{c}} a_{11} & \cdots & a_{1N} \\ \vdots & \ddots & \vdots \\ a_{M1} & \cdots & a_{MN} \end{array} \right)$

where $a_{MN}$ is the element location in the matrix A, and we can define the window size to be $w_{ex}\times w_{ex}$. Thus, we can obtain the maximum and minimum value from the matrix as follows:

$$a_{mn} \triangleq
\begin{cases}
\text{local max} & \text{if } a_{mn} > a_{k\ell}, \\
\text{local min} & \text{if } a_{mn} < a_{k\ell},
\end{cases}$$

where

$k = m - \frac{w_{ex} - 1}{2}:m + \frac{w_{ex} - 1}{2},(k \ne m)$

$\ell = n - \frac{w_{ex} - 1}{2}:n + \frac{w_{ex} - 1}{2},(\ell \ne n)$

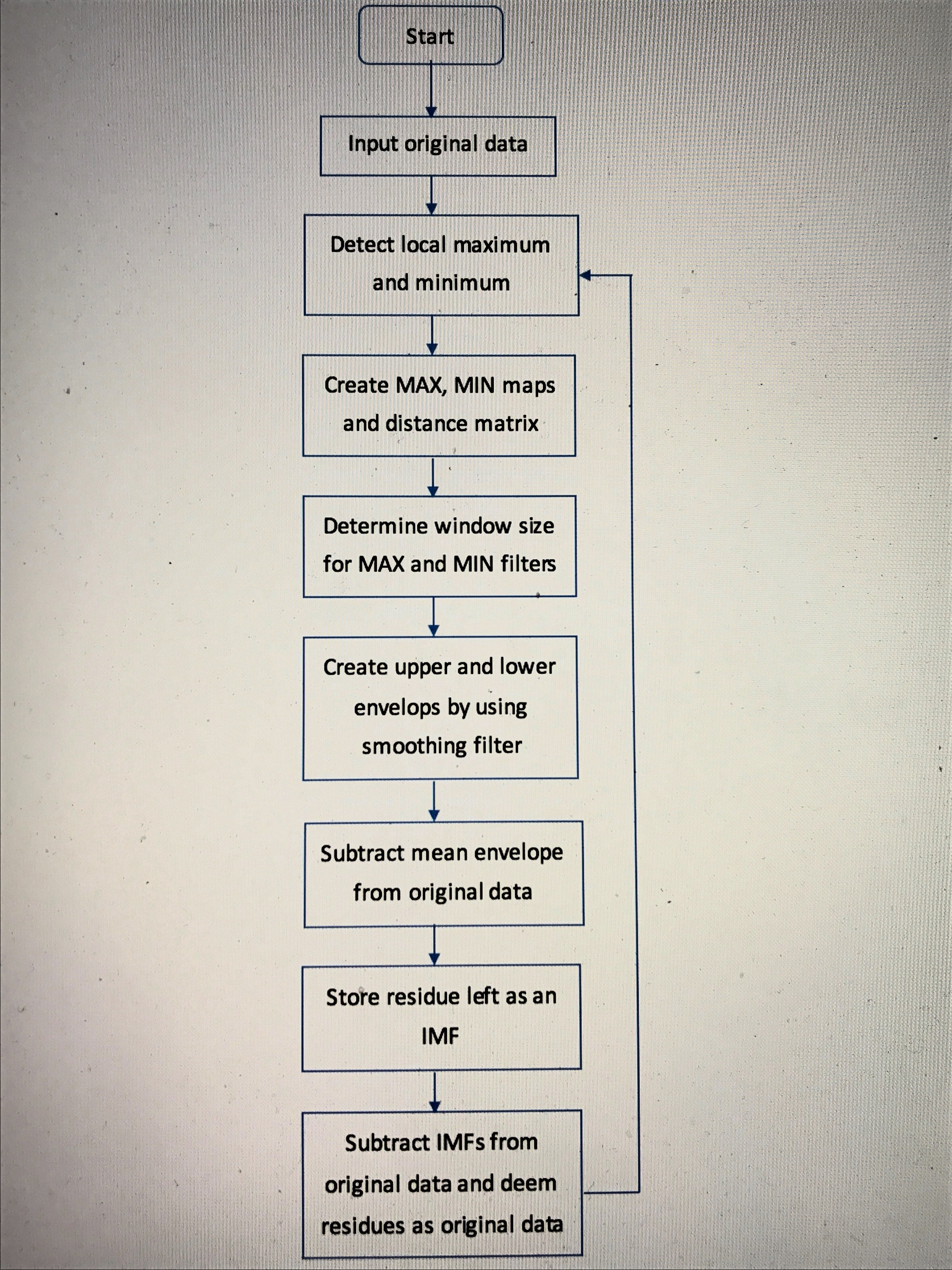
Flow chart for FABEMD algorithm

Step 2 – Obtain the size of window for order-statistic filter

At first, we define $d_{\mathrm{adj}-\max}$ and $d_{\mathrm{adj}-\min}$ to be the maximum and minimum distance in the array which is calculated from each local maximum or minimum point to the nearest nonzero element. Also, $d_{\mathrm{adj}-\max}$ and $d_{\mathrm{adj}-\min}$ will be sorted in descending order in the array according to the convenient selection. Otherwise, we will only consider square window. Thus, the gross window width will be as follows:

$w_{\max \rm{\_en - g}} = \operatorname{minimum} \{ d_{\mathrm{adj} - \max} \}$

$w_{\max \rm{\_en - g}} = \operatorname{maximum} \{ d_{\mathrm{adj} -\max}\}$

$w_{\min \rm{\_en - g}} = \operatorname{minimum} \{ d_{\mathrm{adj} - \min}\}$

$w_{\min \rm{\_en - g}} = \operatorname{maximum} \{ d_\mathrm{adj - \min}\}$

Step 3 – Apply order statistics and smoothing filters to obtain the MAX and MIN filter output

To obtain the upper and lower envelopes, there should be defined two parameter $U_{Ej}(x,y)$ and $L_{Ej}(x,y)$, and the equation will be as follows:

$U_{Ej}(x,y) = \max \{ F_{Tj}(s,t)\} = \frac{1}{w_{sm} \times w_{sm}} \sum_{(s,t) \in Z_{xy}} {U_{Ej}}(s,t)$

$L_{Ej}(x,y) = \min \{ F_{Tj}(s,t)\} = \frac{1}{w_{sm} \times w_{sm}} \sum_{(s,t) \in Z_{xy}} L_{Ej}(s,t)$

where $Z_{xy}$ is defined as the square region of window size, and $w_{sm}$ is the window width of the smoothing filter which $w_{sm}$ equals to $w_{en}$. Therefore, the MAX and MIN filter will form a new 2-D matrix for envelope surface which will not change the original 2-D input data.

Step 4 – Set up an estimation from upper and lower envelopes

This step is to make sure that the envelope estimation in FABEMD is nearly closed to the result from BEMD by using interpolation. In order to do comparison, we need to form corresponding matrices for upper envelope, lower envelope and mean envelope by using thin-plate spline surface interpolation to the max and min maps.

=== Advantages ===
This method (FABEMD) provides a way to use less computation to obtain the result rapidly, and it allows us to ensure more accurate estimation of the BIMFs. Even more, the FABEMD is more adaptive to handle the large size input than the traditional BEMD. Otherwise, the FABEMD is an efficient method that we do not need to consider the boundary effects and overshoot-undershoot problems.

=== Limitations ===
There is one particular problem that we will face in this method. Sometimes, there will be only one local maxima or minima element in the input data, so it will cause the distance array to be empty.

== Partial differential equation-based multidimensional empirical mode decomposition ==
=== Concept ===
The Partial Differential Equation-Based Multidimensional Empirical Mode Decomposition (PDE-based MEMD) approach is a way to improve and overcome the difficulties of mean-envelope estimation of a signal from the traditional EMD. The PDE-based MEMD focus on modifying the original algorithm for MEMD. Thus, the result will provide an analytical formulation which can facilitate theoretical analysis and performance observation. In order to perform multidimensional EMD, we need to extend the 1-D PDE-based sifting process to 2-D space as shown by the steps below.

Here, we take 2-D PDE-based EMD as an example.

=== PDE-based BEMD algorithm ===
Step 1 – Extend super diffusion model from 1-D to 2-D

Considered a super diffusion matrix function

$G_q(x) = \left(\begin{array}{*{20}{c}} g_{q,1}(x) & 0 \\ 0&g_{q,2}(x) \end{array} \right)$

where ${g_{q,i}}(x)$ represent the qth-order stopping function in direction i.

Then, based on the Navier–Stokes equations, diffusion equation will be:

$u_t(x,t) = \operatorname{div}(\alpha {G_1}\nabla u(x,t) - (1 - \alpha ){G_2} \nabla \Delta u(x,t))$

where $\alpha$ is the tension parameter, and we assumed that $q=2$ .

Step 2 – Connect the relationship between diffusion model and PDEs on implicit surface

In order to relate to PDEs, the given equation will be

$u_t(x,t) = -( - 1)^q \nabla _S^{2q} u(x,t)$

where $\nabla _S^{2q}$ is the 2qth-order differential operator on u intrinsic to surface S, and the initial condition for the equation will be $u(y,t)=f$ for any y on surface S.

Step 3 – Consider all the numerical resolutions

To obtain the theoretical and analysis result from the previous equation, we need to make an assumption.

Assumption:

The numerical resolution schemes are assumed to be 4th-order PDE with no tension, and the equation for 4th-order PDE will be

$u_t = -\sum_{i,j = 1}^2 \partial_{x_i}^1(g_i\partial_{x_i}^1\partial_{x_j}^2u)$

First of all, we will explicit scheme by approximating the PDE-based sifting process.

$U^{k + 1} = \left(I - \Delta t\sum_{i,j = 1}^2 L_{ij} \right) U^k$

where $U$ is a vector which consists of the value of each pixel, $L_{ij}$ is a matrix which is a difference approximation to the operator, and $\Delta t$ is a small time step.

Secondly, we can use additive operator splitting (AOS) scheme to improve the property of stability, because the small time step $\Delta t$ will be unstable when it comes to a large time step.

Finally, we can use the alternating direction implicit (ADI) scheme. By using ADI-type schemes, it is suggested that to mix a derivative term to overcome the problem that ADI-type schemes can only be used in second-order diffusion equation. The numerically solved equation will be :

$U^{k + 1} = \left(\prod_{n = 1}^2 (I - \Delta t A_{nn}) \right)^{-1} (I + \Delta t\sum_{i = 1}^2 \sum_{j \ne i} A_{ij} ) U^k$

where $A_{ij}$ is a matrix which is the central difference approximation to the operator $a_{ij} \partial_{x_i}^1 \partial_{x_j}^2$

=== Advantages ===
Based on the Navier–Stokes equations directly, this approach provides a good way to obtain and develop theoretical and numerical results. In particular, the PDE-based BEMD can work well for image decomposition fields. This approach can be applied to extract transient signal and avoiding the indeterminacy characterization in some signals.

== Boundary processing in bidimensional empirical decomposition ==
=== Concept ===
There are some problems in BEMD and boundary extending implementation in the iterative sifting process, including time-consuming, shape and continuity of the edges, decomposition results comparison and so on. In order to fix these problems, the Boundary Processing in Bidimensional Empirical Decomposition (BPBEMD) method was created. The main points of the new method algorithm will be described next.

=== BPBEMD algorithm ===
The few core steps for BPBEMD algorithm are:

Step 1

Assuming the size of original input data and resultant data to be $N\times N$ and $(N+2M)\times(N+2M)$, respectively, we can also define that original input data matrix to be in the middle of resultant data matrix.

Step 2

Divide both original input data matrix and resultant data matrix into blocks of $M\times M$ size.

Step 3

Find the block which is the most similar to its neighbor block in the original input data matrix, and put it into the corresponding resultant data matrix.

Step 4

Form a distance matrix which the matrix elements are weighted by different distances between each block from those boundaries.

Step 5

Implement iterative extension when resultant data matrix faces a huge boundary extension, we can see that the block in original input data matrix is corresponding to the block in resultant data matrix.

=== Advantages ===
This method can process larger number of elements than traditional BEMD method. Also, it can shorten the time-consuming for the process. Depended on using nonparametric sampling based texture synthesis, the BPBEMD could obtain better result after decomposing and extracting.

=== Limitations ===
Because most of image inputs are non-stationary which don't exist boundary problems, the BPBEMD method is still lack of enough evidence that it is adaptive to all kinds of input data. Also, this method is narrowly restricted to be use on texture analysis and image processing.

== Applications ==
In the first part, these MEEMD techniques can be used on Geophysical data sets such as climate, magnetic, seismic data variability which takes advantage of the fast algorithm of MEEMD. The MEEMD is often used for nonlinear geophysical data filtering due to its fast algorithms and its ability to handle large amount of data sets with the use of compression without losing key information. The IMF can also be used as a signal enhancement of Ground Penetrating Radar for nonlinear data processing; it is very effective to detect geological boundaries from the analysis of field anomalies.

In the second part, the PDE-based MEMD and FAMEMD can be implemented on audio processing, image processing and texture analysis. Because of its several properties, including stability, less time-consuming and so on, PDE-based MEMD methods are used for adaptive decomposition, data denoising and texture analysis. Furthermore, the FAMEMD has been used to reduce computation time and have a precise estimation in the process. Finally, the BPBEMD method has been used for image processing and texture analysis due to its property to solve the extension boundary problems in recent techniques.
