= French Academy of Sciences =

French learned society

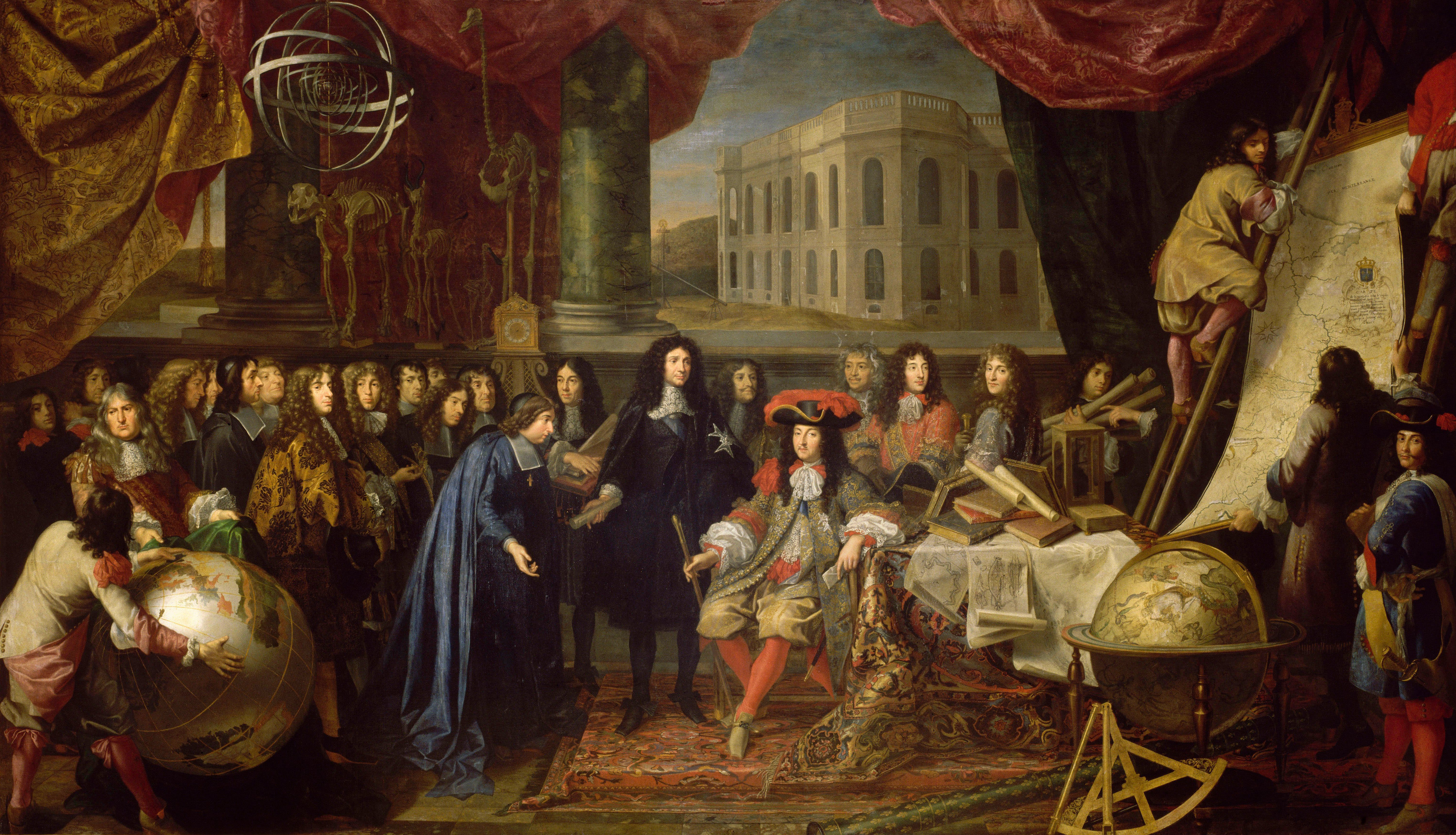
Colbert Presenting the Members of the Royal Academy of Sciences to Louis XIV in 1667, by Henri Testelin; in the background appears the new Paris Observatory

The French Academy of Sciences (French: Académie des sciences [akademi de sjɑ̃s]) is a learned society, founded in 1666 by Louis XIV at the suggestion of Jean-Baptiste Colbert, to encourage and protect the spirit of French scientific research. It was at the forefront of scientific developments in Europe in the 17th and 18th centuries, and is one of the earliest Academies of Sciences.

Currently headed by Patrick Flandrin (President of the academy), it is one of the five Academies of the Institut de France.

== History ==
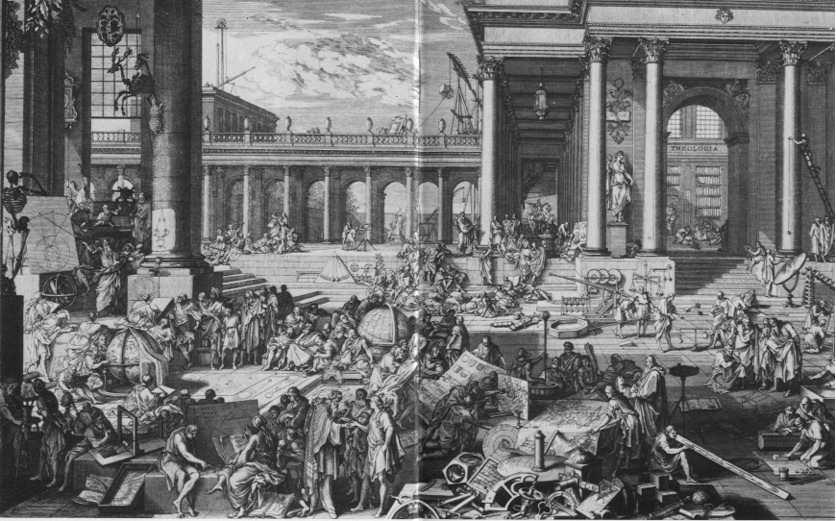
A heroic depiction of the activities of the Academy from 1698

The Academy of Sciences traces its origin to Colbert's plan to create a general academy. He chose a small group of scholars who met on 22 December 1666 in the King's library, near the present-day Bibliothèque Nationale, and thereafter held twice-weekly working meetings there in the two rooms assigned to the group. The first 30 years of the academy's existence were relatively informal, since no statutes had as yet been laid down for the institution.

In contrast to its British counterpart, the academy was founded as an organ of government. In Paris, there were not many membership openings, to fill positions there were contentious elections. The election process was at least a 6-stage process with rules and regulations that allowed for chosen candidates to canvas other members and for current members to consider postponing certain stages of the process if the need would arise. Elections in the early days of the academy were important activities, and as such made up a large part of the proceedings at the academy, with many meetings being held regarding the election to fill a single vacancy within the academy. That is not to say that discussion of candidates and the election process as a whole was relegated to the meetings. Members that belonged to the vacancy's respective field would continue discussion of potential candidates for the vacancy in private. Being elected into the academy did not necessarily guarantee being a full member, in some cases, one would enter the academy as an associate or correspondent before being appointed as a full member of the academy.

The election process was originally only to replace members from a specific section. For example, if someone whose study was mathematics was either removed or resigned from his position, the following election process nominated only those whose focus was also mathematics in order to fill that discipline's vacancy. That led to some periods of time in which no specialists for specific fields of study could be found, which left positions in those fields vacant since they could not be filled with people in other disciplines.

The needed reform came late in the 20th century, in 1987, when the academy decided against the practice and to begin filling vacancies with people with new disciplines. This reform was not only aimed at further diversifying the disciplines under the academy, but also to help combat the internal aging of the academy itself. The academy was expected to remain apolitical, and to avoid discussion of religious and social issues.

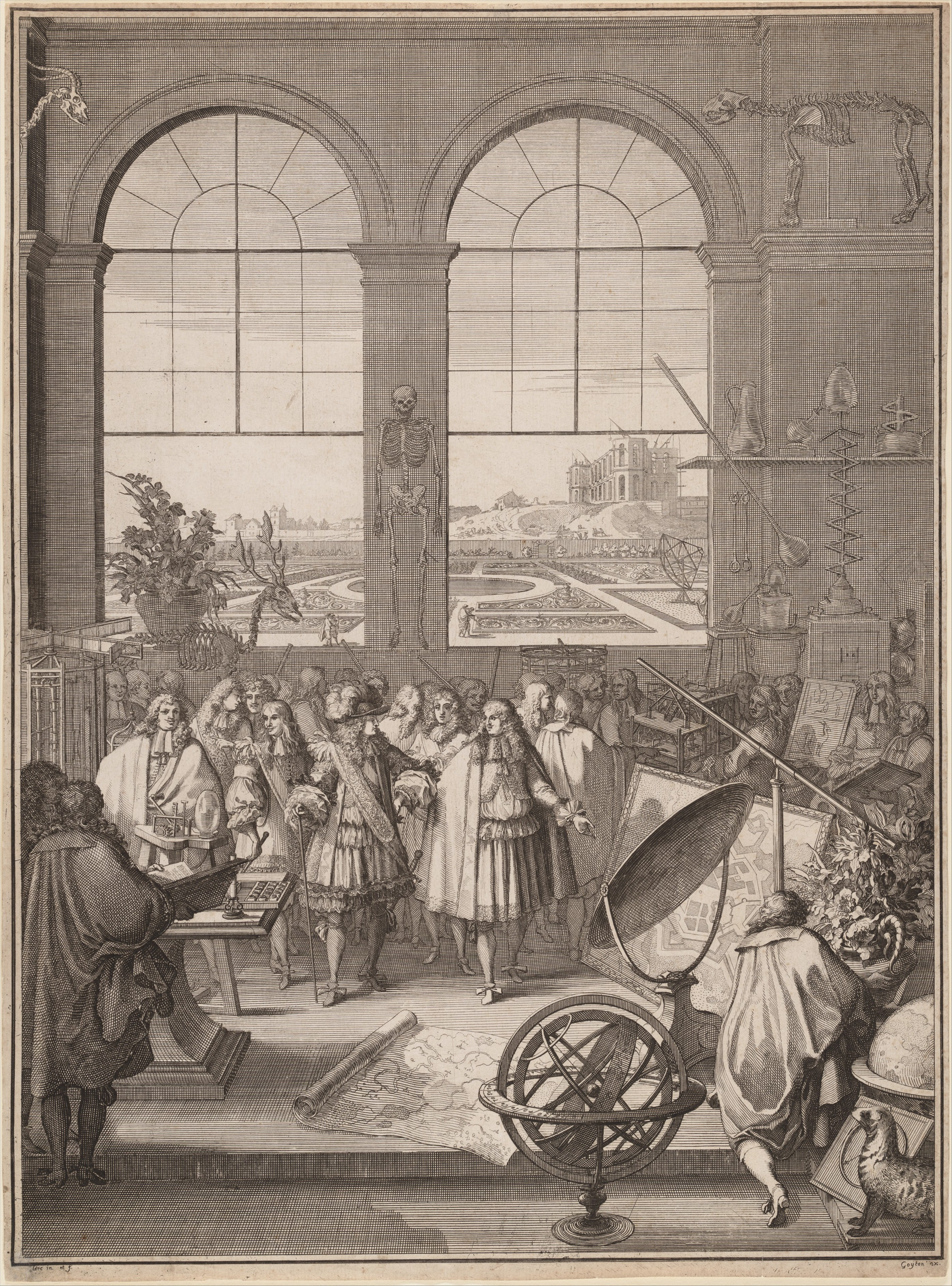
Louis XIV visiting the Royal Academy of Sciences (Sébastien Leclerc I, France, 1671)

On 20 January 1699, Louis XIV gave the Company its first rules. The academy received the name of Royal Academy of Sciences and was installed in the Louvre in Paris. Following this reform, the academy began publishing a volume each year with information on all the work done by its members and obituaries for members who had died. This reform also codified the method by which members of the academy could receive pensions for their work.

The academy was originally organized by the royal reform hierarchically into the following groups: Pensionaires, Pupils, Honoraires, and Associés.

The reform also added new groups not previously recognized, such as Vétéran. Some of these role's member limits were expanded and some roles even removed or combined throughout the course of academy's history. The Honoraires group establish by this reform in 1699 whose members were directly appointed by the King was recognized until its abolishment in 1793.

Membership in the academy exceeded 100 officially-recognised full members only in 1976, 310 years after the academy's inception in 1666. The membership increase came with a large-scale reorganization in 1976. Under this reorganization, 130 resident members, 160 correspondents, and 80 foreign associates could be elected.

A vacancy opens only upon the death of members, as they serve for life. During elections, half of the vacancies are reserved for people less than 55 years old. This was created as an attempt to encourage younger members to join the academy.

The reorganization also divided the academy into 2 divisions:

- One division, Division 1, covers the applications of mathematics and physical sciences.
- The other, Division 2, covers the applications of chemical, natural, biological, and medical sciences.

On 8 August 1793, the National Convention abolished all the academies. On 22 August 1795, a National Institute of Sciences and Arts was put in place, bringing together the old academies of the sciences, literature and arts, among them the Académie française and the Académie des sciences.

Also in 1795, The academy determined these 10 titles (first 4 in Division 1 and the others in Division 2) to be their newly accepted branches of scientific study:

1. Mathematics
2. Mechanics
3. Astronomy
4. Physics
5. Chemistry
6. Mineralogy
7. Botany
8. Agriculture
9. Anatomy and Zoology
10. Medicine and Surgery

The last two sections are bundled since there were many good candidates fit to be elected for those practices, and the competition was stiff. Some individuals like François Magendie had made stellar advancements in their selected fields of study, that warranted a possible addition of new fields. However, even someone like Magendie, who had made breakthroughs in physiology and impressed the academy with his hands-on vivisection experiments, could not get his study into its own category. Despite Magendie being one of the leading innovators of his time, it was still a battle for him to become an official member of the academy, a feat he would later accomplish in 1821. He further improved the reverence of the academy when he and anatomist Charles Bell produced the widely known Bell–Magendie law.

From 1795 until 1914, the first world war, the French Academy of Science was the most prevalent organization of French science. Almost all the old members of the previously abolished Académie were formally re-elected and retook their ancient seats. Among the exceptions was Dominique, comte de Cassini, who refused to take his seat. Membership in the academy was not restricted to scientists: in 1798 Napoleon Bonaparte was elected a member of the academy and three years later a president in connection with his Egyptian expedition, which had a scientific component. In 1816, the again renamed "Royal Academy of Sciences" became autonomous, while forming part of the Institute of France; the head of State became its patron. In the Second Republic, the name returned to Académie des sciences. During this period, the academy was funded by and accountable to the Ministry of Public Instruction. The academy came to control French patent laws in the course of the eighteenth century, acting as the liaison of artisans' knowledge to the public domain. As a result, academicians dominated technological activities in France. The academy proceedings were published under the name Comptes rendus de l'Académie des Sciences (1835–1965). The Comptes rendus is now a journal series with seven titles. The publications can be found on site of the French National Library.

In 1818 the French Academy of Sciences launched a competition to explain the properties of light. The civil engineer Augustin-Jean Fresnel entered the competition by submitting a new wave theory of light. Siméon Denis Poisson, one of the members of the judging committee, studied Fresnel's theory in detail. Being a supporter of the particle-theory of light, he looked for a way to disprove it. Poisson thought that he had found a flaw when he demonstrate that Fresnel's theory predicts that an on-axis bright spot would exist in the shadow of a circular obstacle, where there should be complete darkness according to the particle-theory of light. The Poisson spot is not easily observed in every-day situations and so it was only natural for Poisson to interpret it as an absurd result and that it should disprove Fresnel's theory. However, the head of the committee, Dominique-François-Jean Arago, and who incidentally later became Prime Minister of France, decided to perform the experiment in more detail. He molded a 2-mm metallic disk to a glass plate with wax. To everyone's surprise he succeeded in observing the predicted spot, which convinced most scientists of the wave-nature of light.

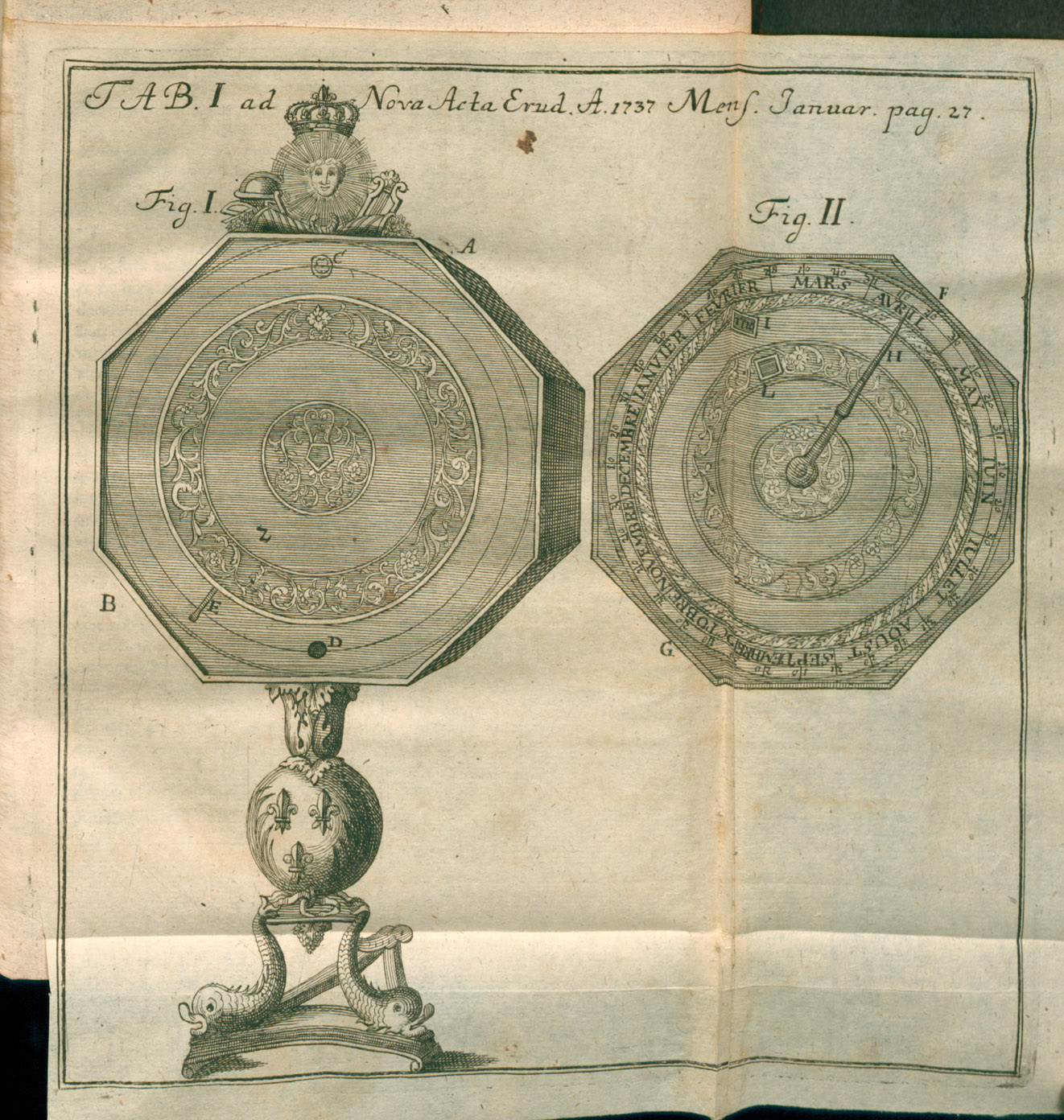
Illustration from Acta Eruditorum (1737) where was published Machines et inventions approuvées par l'Academie Royale des Sciences

For three centuries women were not allowed as members of the academy. This meant that many women scientists were excluded, including two-time Nobel Prize winner Marie Curie, Nobel winner Irène Joliot-Curie, mathematician Sophie Germain, and many other deserving women scientists. The first woman admitted as a correspondent member was a student of Curie's, Marguerite Perey, in 1962. The first female full member was Yvonne Choquet-Bruhat in 1979.

Membership in the academy is highly geared towards representing common French populace demographics. French population increases and changes in the early 21st century led to the academy expanding reference population sizes by reform in the early 2002.

The overwhelming majority of members leave the academy posthumously, with a few exceptions of removals, transfers, and resignations. The last member to be removed from the academy was in 1944. Removal from the academy was often for not performing to standards, not performing at all, leaving the country, or political reasons. In some rare occasions, a member has been elected twice and subsequently removed twice. This is the case for Marie-Adolphe Carnot.

== Government interference ==
The most direct involvement of the government in the affairs of the institute came in the initial nomination of members in 1795, but as its members nominated constituted only one third of the membership and most of these had previously been elected as members of the respective academies under the old regime, few objections were raised. Moreover, these nominated members were then completely free to nominate the remaining members of the institute. Members expected to remain such for life, but interference occurred in a few cases where the government suddenly terminated membership for political reasons. The other main interference came when the government refused to accept the result of academy elections. The academies control by the government was apparent in 1803, when Bonaparte decided on a general reorganization. His principal concern was not the First class but the Second, which included political scientists who were potential critics of his government. Bonaparte abolished the second class completely and, after a few expulsions, redistributed its remaining members, together with those of the Third class, into a new Second class concerned with literature and a new Third class devoted to the fine arts. Still this relationship between the academy and the government was not a one-way affair, as members expected to receive their payment of an honorarium.

== Decline ==
Although the academy still exists today, after World War I, the reputation and status of the academy was largely questioned. One factor behind its decline was the development from a meritocracy to gerontocracy: a shift from those with demonstrated scientific ability leading the academy to instead favoring those with seniority. It became known as a sort of "hall of fame" that lost control, real and symbolic, of the professional scientific diversity in France at the time. Another factor was that in the span of five years, 1909 to 1914, funding to science faculties considerably dropped, eventually leading to a financial crisis in France.

== Present use ==
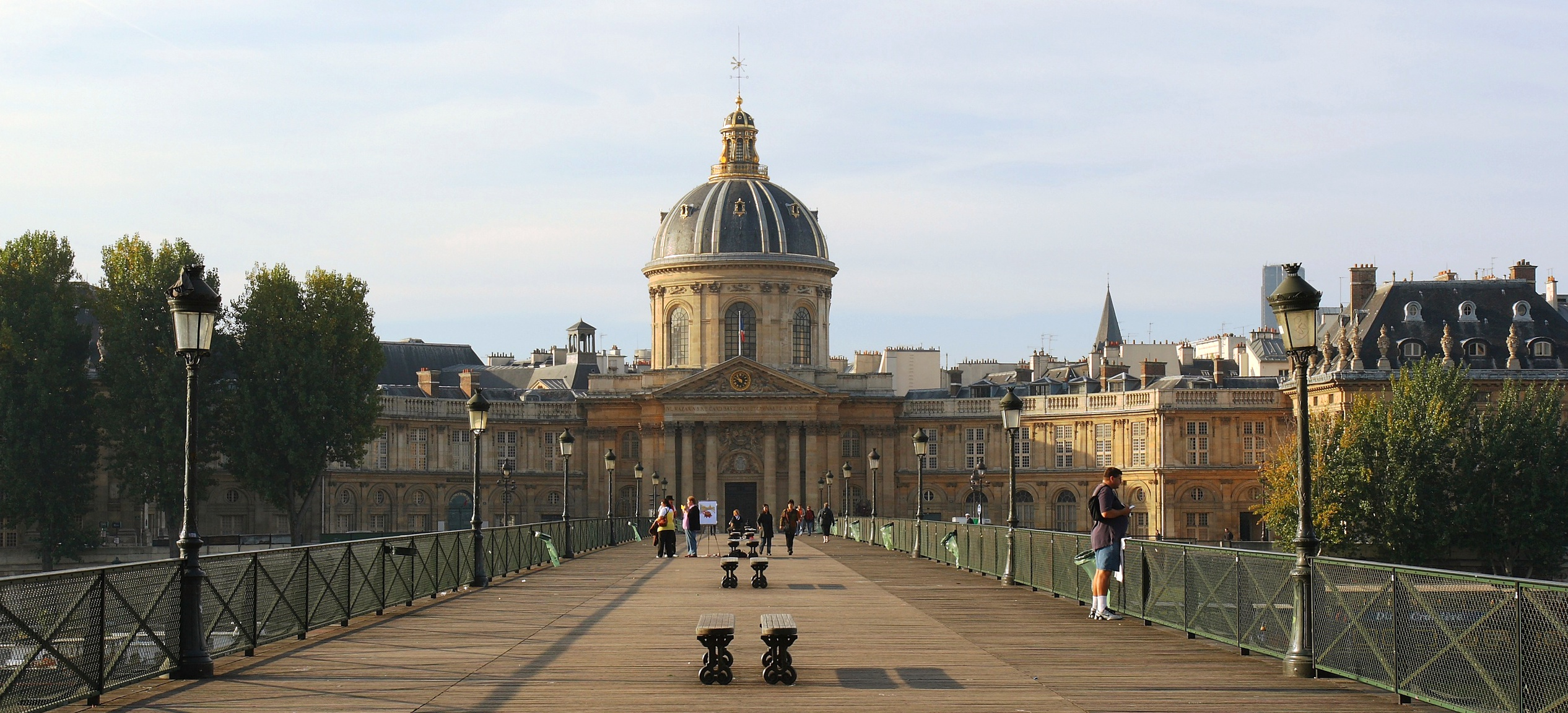
The Institut de France in Paris where the academy is housed

Today the academy is one of five academies comprising the Institut de France. Its members are elected for life. Currently, there are 150 full members, 300 corresponding members, and 120 foreign associates. They are divided into two scientific groups: the Mathematical and Physical sciences and their applications and the Chemical, Biological, Geological and Medical sciences and their applications. The academy currently has five missions that it pursues. These being the encouraging of the scientific life, promoting the teaching of science, transmitting knowledge between scientific communities, fostering international collaborations, and ensuring a dual role of expertise and advise. The French Academy of Science originally focused its development efforts into creating a true co-development Euro-African program beginning in 1997. Since then they have broadened their scope of action to other regions of the world. The standing committee COPED is in charge of the international development projects undertaken by the French Academy of Science and their associates. The current president of COPED is Pierre Auger, the vice president is Michel Delseny, and the honorary president is Francois Gros. All of which are current members of the French Academy of Science. COPED has hosted several workshops or colloquia in Paris, involving representatives from African academies, universities or research centers, addressing a variety of themes and challenges dealing with African development and covering a large field spectrum. Specifically higher education in sciences, and research practices in basic and applied sciences that deal with various aspects relevant to development (renewable energy, infectious diseases, animal pathologies, food resources, access to safe water, agriculture, urban health, etc.).

== Current committees and working parties ==
The Academic Standing Committees and Working Parties prepare the advice notes, policy statements and the Academic Reports. Some have a statutory remit, such as the Select Committee, the Committee for International Affairs and the Committee for Scientists' Rights, some are created ad hoc by the academy and approved formally by vote in a members-only session.

Today the academies standing committees and working parties include:

- The Academic Standing Committee in charge of the Biennial Report on Science and Technology
- The Academic Standing Committee for Science, Ethics and Society
- The Academic Standing Committee for the Environment
- The Academic Standing Committee for Space Research
- The Academic Standing Committee for Science and Metrology
- The Academic Standing Committee for the Science History and Epistemology
- The Academic Standing Committee for Science and Safety Issues
- The Academic Standing Committee for Science Education and Training
- The Academic Standing La main à la pâte Committee
- The Academic Standing Committee for the Defense of Scientists' Rights (CODHOS)
- The Academic Standing Committee for International Affairs (CORI)
- The French Committee for International Scientific Unions (COFUSI)
- The Academic Standing Committee for Scientific and Technological International Relations (CARIST)
- The Academic Standing Committee for Developing Countries (COPED)
- The Inter-academic Group for Development (GID) – Cf. for further reading
- The Academic Standing Commission for Sealed Deposits
- The Academic Standing Committee for Terminology and Neologisms
- The Antoine Lavoisier Standing Committee
- The Academic Standing Committee for Prospects in Energy Procurement
- The Special Academic Working Party on Scientific Computing
- The Special Academic Working Party on Material Sciences and Engineering

== Medals, awards and prizes ==
Each year, the Academy of Sciences distributes about 80 prizes. These include:

- Marie Skłodowska-Curie and Pierre Curie Polish-French Science Award, created in 2022.
- the Grande Médaille, awarded annually, in rotation, in the relevant disciplines of each division of the academy, to a French or foreign scholar who has contributed to the development of science in a decisive way.
- the Lalande Prize, awarded from 1802 through 1970, for outstanding achievement in astronomy
- the Valz Prize, awarded from 1877 through 1970, to honor advances in astronomy
- the Richard Lounsbery Award, jointly with the National Academy of Sciences
- the Prix Jacques Herbrand, for mathematics and physics
- the Prix Paul Pascal, for chemistry
- the Louis Bachelier Prize for major contributions to mathematical modeling in finance
- the Prix Michel-Monpetit for computer science and applied mathematics, awarded since 1977
- the Leconte Prize, awarded annually since 1886, to recognize important discoveries in mathematics, physics, chemistry, natural history or medicine
- the Prix Tchihatcheff (Tchihatchef; Chikhachev)

== People ==
The following are incomplete lists of the officers of the academy. See also Category:Officers of the French Academy of Sciences.

For a list of the academy's members past and present, see Category:Members of the French Academy of Sciences

=== Presidents ===
Source: French Academy of Sciences

- 1800 Napoleon Bonaparte
- 1906 Henri Poincaré
- 1952 Albert Caquot
- 2001–2002 Hubert Curien
- 2003–2004 Étienne-Émile Baulieu
- 2005–2006 Édouard Brézin
- 2007–2008 Jules Hoffmann
- 2009–2010 Jean Salençon
- 2011–2012 Alain Carpentier
- 2013–2014 Philippe Taquet
- 2015–2016 Bernard Meunier
- 2017–2018 Sébastien Candel
- 2019–2020 Pierre Corvol
- 2021–2022 Patrick Flandrin
- 2023–2024 Alain Fischer
- 2025– Françoise Combes

=== Treasurers ===
- ?–1788 Georges-Louis Leclerc, Comte de Buffon
- 1788–1791 Mathieu Tillet

=== Permanent secretaries ===
==== General ====
- December 1666 – April 1668 Jean-Baptiste Du Hamel
- April 1668 – December 1669 Jean Gallois
- January 1670 – January 1697 Jean-Baptiste Du Hamel
- January 1697 – December 1740 Bernard le Bovier de Fontenelle (nominated by king in Jan 1699)
- January 1741 – August 1743 Jean-Jacques Dortous de Mairan
- September 1743 – July 1776 Jean-Paul Grandjean de Fouchy
- August 1777 – August 1793 Nicolas Caritat, Marquis of Condorcet

==== Mathematical Sciences ====
- 1801–1822 Jean Baptiste Joseph Delambre
- 1822–1830 Joseph Fourier
- 1830–1853 François Arago
- 1853–1874 Léonce Élie de Beaumont
- 1874–1900 Joseph Bertrand
- 1900–1917 Gaston Darboux
- 1917–1942 Émile Picard
- 1942–1975 Louis de Broglie
- 1975–1996 Paul Germain
- Currently: Jean Dercourt
- Currently: Odile Macchi

==== Physical Sciences ====
- 1795–1803 Bernard Germain de Lacépède
- 1803–1832 Georges Cuvier
- 1832–1833 Pierre-Louis Dulong
- 1833–1868 Pierre Flourens
- 1868–1884 Jean-Baptiste Dumas
- 1884–1886 Jules Jamin
- 1886–1887 Alfred Vulpian
- 1887–1889 Louis Pasteur
- 1889–1907 Marcelin Berthelot
- 1907 Albert de Lapparent
- 1908 Henri Becquerel
- 1908–1914 Philippe van Tieghem
- 1914–1948 Alfred Lacroix

==== Chemistry and Biology ====
- 1948–1986 Robert Courrier
- 1986–1991 Alfred Jost
- 1991–2001 François Gros
- 2001–2006 Nicole Le Douarin
- 2006–2011 Jean-François Bach
- currently Catherine Bréchignac
- currently Ilan Marek

== Publications ==
- Publications of the French Academy of Sciences "Histoire de l'Académie royale des sciences" (1700–1790)

== See also ==
- French art salons and academies
- French Geodesic Mission
- History of the metre
- Seconds pendulum
- Royal Commission on Animal Magnetism
