= Ilan Marek =

French-Israeli chemist

- אילן מרק
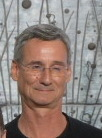
- Education: University Pierre et Marie Curie
- Scientific career
- Fields: Chemistry

Ilan Marek (Hebrew: אילן מרק; born 15 February 1963 in Haifa) is a bi-national French-Israeli chemist. He is particularly interested in the design and development of new stereo- and enantioselective strategies for the creation of several contiguous stereogenic centres and by the functionalization of organic molecules at the least reactive position. These processes are carried out in a single chemical step and lead to the synthesis of complex molecular structures. Understanding reaction mechanisms provides insight into the origins of stereoselectivity and governs optimization for the development of the most effective and general methodologies possible.

== Biography ==
He studied at the University Pierre et Marie Curie in Paris (BsC 1983 and obtained his MsC in chemistry in 1986 and his PhD under the supervision of Prof. Jean Normant in December 1988). He then spent a year at the Catholic University of Louvain, Belgium, for a postdoctoral stay with Professor Leon Ghosez (1989). He was recruited at the CNRS (Centre National de la Recherche Scientifique) in 1990 at the University Pierre et Marie Curie in Paris, received his habilitation in 1995 and moved in September 1997 to the Technion - Israel Institute of Technology as an assistant professor. He was promoted to associate professor in 2000 and professor in 2004. Since 2005, he holds the Sir Michael and Lady Sobell Academic Chair. He has been Visiting Professor at Tokyo University Institute of Technology (Japan), the University of Montreal (Canada), the University of Strasbourg (France), the University of Paris-Descartes (France), the California Institute of Technology (Caltech, United States), the University of Montpellier (France), Taïwan Science Council, the University of Osaka Prefecture (Japan), Wilhems-University Munster, (Germany), Taïwan National Council, University of Ottawa, (Canada). Since 2022 Prof. Marek is distinguished university professor and director of the Stewart and Lynda Resnik Sustainability Center for Catalysis (Technion)

Ilan Marek is the author of numerous publications (more than 285 in international journals), and have edited 15 books in the Patai’s series. He is the recipient of numerous international awards for academic excellence and for excellence in teaching. He is a member of the editorial board of more than ten scientific journals.

== Member of scientific committees and associate publisher ==
Ilan Marek was serving as editorial board member in many different journals such as Chemical Communications, (RSC); Organic and Biomolecular Chemistry, (RSC); European Journal of Organic Chemistry, (WILEY-VCH); and is still active member in The Chemical Record, (Wiley-VCH); Advanced Synthesis and Catalysis, (Wiley-VCH); Synthesis, (Thieme ); Synlett, Thieme; Angewandte Chemie International Edition, (WILEY-VCH); Chemistry, A European Journal, (WILEY-VCH); Helvetica, (WILEY-VCH); Chemical Reviews (ACS); ACS Central Science (ACS), Chem Catalysis (Cell).

He is editor of numerous journals and revues : Comprehensive Organic Synthesis (Second Edition. Elsevier); Beilstein Journal of Organic Chemistry; Israel Journal of Chemistry, (Wiley-VCH); Tetrahedron (Elsevier); “The Chemistry of Functional groups” Patai series, (WILEY-Chichester).

== International administrative functions ==
He was a member of the Scientific Council of the European Symposium on Organic Chemistry (ESOC) from 2005 to 2009 and chairman of this Scientific Council from 2007 to 2009. He has been a member of the Scientific Council for the Development of Chemistry of the Institute of Natural Substances, GIF/Yvette, France. He was the Israeli president of the Scientific Commission of the France-Israel Foundation from 2007 to 2011. Since 2007 he has been the Israeli representative of the Organic Chemistry Division of EUCHEM (European Association for Chemical and Molecular Sciences) from 2009 to 2011, he became its vice-president and was elected president from 2012 to 2015. In 2009, he was a member of the evaluation committee of the University of Bordeaux, France; of the Chemistry Department of the École Normale Supérieure (ENS), France and chairman of the evaluation committee of the Chemistry Department of the University of Cyprus in 2012, Member of the International board to evaluate the CNRS, France (2022); Chairman evaluation Committee Department of Chemistry, University of Vienna (2023), member of the evaluation committee of the department of Chemistry of the Hebrew University of Jerusalem (2024), member of the evaluation committee of IBM, Daejeon, Korea (2024). Since 2016 Marek is a member of the Jury Grand Prix de la Fondation de la Maison de la Chimie, Paris, France, was a member of the Rothschild Committee (2016-2023). Since 2021, he serves as a member of the Aaron and Ephraim Katzir Scholarship Fund and a member of the advisory committee of the Batsheva Rothschild Foundation, both of the Israel National Academy of Sciences.

== Distinctions and honors ==
Ilan Marek has been elected several times as an excellent teacher and received the Yannai Award for excellence in teaching (2016).

He has won numerous awards and among them, the French Chemical Society Award - Acros for young chemist under 40 years old (1997); the Yigal Alon Fellowship (1998); the Henry Gutwirth Foundation Award (1998); the Klein Award for the development of original synthetic methods (1999); the Yosefa and Leonid Allschwang Award, Israel Science Foundation (ISF 2000); the Michael Bruno Award, Rothschild Foundation (2002); the best Young Chemist Award, Israel Chemical Society (2003); the Bessel Award, Humboldt Foundation (2005); the Henry Taub Prize for Academic Excellence (2009); the Germany-Technion Prize for Academic Excellence (2010); the Schulich Prize for the Promotion of Extraordinary Academic Activities (2010); the Royal Society Chemistry Prize in Organometallic Chemistry (UK, 2011); the Janssen Pharmaceutics Prize for Creativity in Organic Synthesis (2012); the Israel Chemical Society Prize of Excellence (2014); the Weizmann Prize for exact Sciences (2015);SFB-guest professor Wilhelms-University Munster, Germany (2015); Thieme Lectureship, Stuttgart, Germany (2016); European Journal of Chemistry Lectureship, Weimar, Germany (2016); Elected as excellent teacher (top 4% of the Technion, 2nd semester, 2016); The Yannai Award for Excellence in Teaching (2016); Basel Chemical Society Lecture, Basel, Switzerland (2017); Taiwan National Science Council Visiting Scholar (2017); President of the 53nd Bürgenstock Conference on Stereochemistry (2018); Elected as excellent teacher (top 4% of the Technion, 1st semester, 2019); Adolf Lieben Lecturer, Austrian Chemical Society (2020); Arthur C. Cope Scholars Award from the American Chemical Society (2021); Elected as Distinguished University Professor (2022); EuChemS Division of Organic Chemistry - Research Award (2024); Inaugural Olivier Lecture series, Netherlands (2024); 29th Felix Serratosa Lectureship, Spain (2025); The Inaugural Olivier Lectureship, Netherlands (2025); Richard Willstätter Lecturership, Germany (2025).

Ilan Marek received 3 times the ERC Advanced Research Grant (in 2013, 2018 and 2025). He was the President of the Bürgenstock meeting in 2018. He has been elected member of the French Academy of sciences in 2017 at the Israel Academy of Sciences and Humanities in 2019., and was Elected as Member of the Academia Europaea, (2021).
