= Norden E. Huang =

Norden Eh Huang (Chinese: 黃鍔; pinyin: Huáng È; born 13 December 1937) is a Taiwanese-American Fluid dynamist known for the Hilbert–Huang transform.

== Biography ==
Huang was born in Hubei, China, in 1937. He attended National Hsinchu Senior High School in Taiwan and graduated from National Taiwan University in 1960 before earning a doctorate in fluid mechanics and mathematics from Johns Hopkins University in 1967. He completed postdoctoral research at the University of Washington, then held adjunct professorships at the University of Delaware and University of North Carolina while working for NASA. Huang returned to Taiwan and began teaching at National Central University in 2006, as K. T. Lee and TSMC Chair Professor.

He was elected a member of the US National Academy of Engineering in 2000 for contributions to the analysis of nonlinear stochastic signals and related mathematical applications in engineering, biology, and other sciences. He was also elected a member of the Taiwan's Academia Sinica in 2004 and a foreign member of the Chinese Academy of Engineering in 2007.
