= Vicarious nucleophilic substitution =

Organic reaction

In organic chemistry, the vicarious nucleophilic substitution is a special type of nucleophilic aromatic substitution in which a nucleophile replaces a hydrogen atom on the aromatic ring and not leaving groups such as halogen substituents which are ordinarily encountered in S_{N}Ar. This reaction type was reviewed in 1987 by Polish chemists Mieczysław Mąkosza and Jerzy Winiarski.

It is typically encountered with nitroarenes and especially with nucleophiles, resulting in alkylated arenes: the new substituent can take the ortho or para positions, reversing the selectivity for the meta position that is usually observed with such compounds under electrophilic substitution. Carbon nucleophiles carry an electron-withdrawing group and a leaving group: the nucleophile attacks the aromatic ring, and excess base can eliminate to form an exocyclic double bond which is successively protonated under acidic conditions, restoring aromaticity.

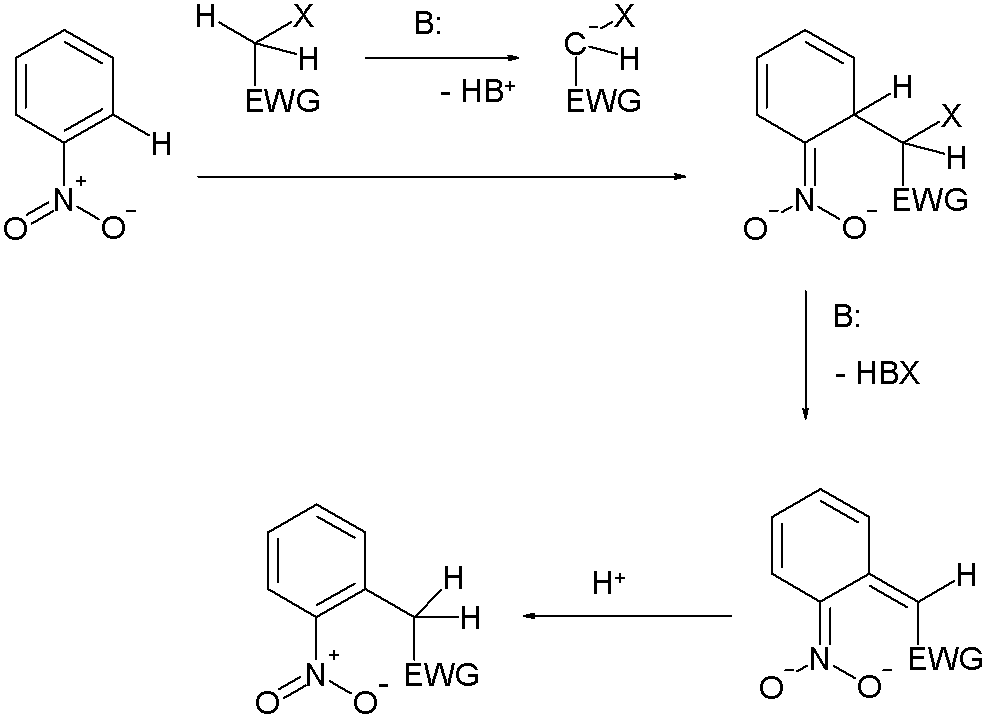
