= European Symposium on Organic Chemistry =

Biennial organic chemistry conference

- Nickname: ESOC
- Status: Active
- Genre: Scientific conference
- Frequency: Biennial
- Location: Europe (rotating host cities)
- Inaugurated: 20–23 August 1979 (Cologne, West Germany)
- Most recent: 30 June–3 July 2025 (Copenhagen, Denmark)
- Participants: 619 (ESOC 2025)
- Website: www.esochem.org

The European Symposium on Organic Chemistry (ESOC) is a biennial scientific conference series covering research in organic chemistry. The first meeting was held in Cologne in 1979.

== History ==
ESOC I took place in Cologne on 20–23 August 1979, organized by the German Chemical Society (GDCh) and sponsored by the Federation of European Chemical Societies. ESOC has since been held approximately every other year.

In 2021, an online mini-symposium was organized during the COVID-19 pandemic.

Meeting reports and overviews have been published for multiple editions.

== Scope and format ==
ESOC features a single-track program of plenary and invited lectures (including award lectures in recent editions) and poster sessions spanning diverse areas of organic chemistry, including total synthesis, synthetic methodology, catalysis, medicinal chemistry and chemical biology, supramolecular chemistry, organic materials, and physical and computational organic chemistry.

== Awards and named lectures ==
Recent ESOC programs have included award-linked lectures such as the Patai–Rappoport Award Lecture and EuChemS Division of Organic Chemistry awards (for example, EuChemS DOC Award for Research and EuChemS DOC Young Investigator Award).

== Past meetings ==
Year	No.	Location	Country	Dates	Conference chairs
2025	23	Copenhagen	Denmark	30 June–3 July	Christian M. Pedersen; Michael Pittelkow
2023	22	Ghent	Belgium	9–13 July	Johan Van der Eycken; Erik Van der Eycken
2021	—	Online	—	5–6 July	Johan Van der Eycken; Erik Van der Eycken
2019	21	Vienna	Austria	14–18 July	Nuno Maulide; Michael Schnürch
2017	20	Cologne	Germany	2–6 July	Hans-Günther Schmalz
2015	19	Lisbon	Portugal	12–16 July	Amélia Pilar Rauter
2013	18	Marseille	France	12–16 July	Jean-A. Rodriguez
2011	17	Crete	Greece	10–15 July	Michael Orfanopoulos
2009	16	Prague	Czech Republic	12–16 July	Ivo Starý
2007	15	Dublin	Ireland	8–13 July	Patrick J. Guiry
2005	14	Helsinki	Finland	4–8 July	Kristina Wähälä
2003	13	Dubrovnik	Croatia	10–15 September	Vitomir I. Šunjić
2001	12	Groningen	Netherlands	13–18 July	Ben Feringa
1999	11	Gothenburg	Sweden	13–18 July	Per Ahlberg
1997	10	Basel	Switzerland	22–27 June	Christoph Tamm
1995	9	Warsaw	Poland	18–23 June	Mieczysław Mąkosza
1993	8	Barcelona	Spain	29 August–3 September	Josep M. Font
1991	7	Namur	Belgium	15–19 July	Alain Krief
1989	6	Belgrade	Yugoslavia	10–15 September	Dragomir K. Vitorović
1987	5	Jerusalem	Israel	30 August–3 September	Itamar Willner
1985	4	Aix-en-Provence	France	5–9 September	Danielle Bouin
1983	3	Canterbury	United Kingdom	5–9 September	Robert F. Hudson
1981	2	Stresa	Italy	1–5 June	Giorgio Modena
1979	1	Cologne	West Germany	20–23 August	Emanuel Vogel
