= Douglas L. Jones =

Douglas L. Jones is the William L. Everitt Distinguished Professor of Electrical and Computer Engineering at the University of Illinois Urbana-Champaign.

== Biography ==
Jones received the BSEE, MSEE, and Ph.D. degrees from Rice University in 1983, 1986, and 1987, respectively. During the 1987–1988 academic year, he was at the University of Erlangen–Nuremberg in Germany on a Fulbright postdoctoral fellowship. Since 1988, he has been with the University of Illinois at Urbana-Champaign, where he is currently a Professor in Electrical and Computer Engineering, the Coordinated Science Laboratory, and the Beckman Institute for Advanced Science and Technology.

In Spring 1995 and 2002 Jones was on sabbatical leave at the University of Washington, and the University of California, Berkeley, respectively. In July through September 1998 he was a participant in the Programme on Nonlinear and Nonstationary Signal Processing at the Isaac Newton Institute for Mathematical Sciences at the University of Cambridge, England. In the Spring semester of 1999 he served as the Texas Instruments Visiting Professor at Rice University. In December 2005 he was an Academic Visitor at the University of Melbourne.

In 2002, Jones was elevated to Fellow of the IEEE for contributions to adaptive and statistical time-frequency analysis. Jones served as a Member-at-Large of the IEEE Signal Processing Society Board of Governors 2002-2005. He teaches courses in the general area of signal processing, and is an author of the laboratory textbooks A Digital Signal Processing Laboratory Using the TMS32010 and DSP Laboratory with TI TMS320C54x. In 2006, he received the UIUC ECE Ronald W. Pratt Award for Teaching Excellence. He is committed to the emerging open-source textbook movement and was the Connexions Author of the Year in 2003. His research interests are in digital signal processing and communications, including non-stationary signal analysis, adaptive filters and beamforming, OFDM and DMT optimization, biologically inspired signal processing, and various applications including low-power wireless communication, MEMS sensory systems, and advanced hearing aids.
