= Michel Delseny =

Michel Delseny (born June 17, 1945) is director of research emeritus at the CNRS and a member of the French Academy of sciences.

Delseny initially focused on the study of gene expression in higher plants, mainly during seed development and germination, as well as in response to stress. He later contributed to the development of plant genomics and focused on the organization and evolution of plant genomes.

== Biography ==
=== University degrees ===
After a Baccalaureate C in Paris in 1963, he obtained a master's degree in natural sciences: Plant Biology and Physiology in Paris in 1968, then a diploma of advanced studies: plant cytology and morphogenesis in Paris in 1969. He passed the agrégation and CAPES in Natural Sciences (1st in both competitions) in 1970, then obtained a doctorate in biochemistry in Montpellier in 1972 and a doctorate in molecular biology in Montpellier in 1977.

=== Positions held ===
- Oct. 1966 – Sept. 1970: Student professor, École normale supérieure de Saint-Cloud.
- Oct. 1970 – Sept. 1979: attaché then research fellow at the CNRS (secondment from Secondary Education until 1982). University of Perpignan. Plant physiology laboratory.
- Oct.1979 – Sept. 1980: Royal Society/CNRS – Post-doctoral fellow, John INNES Institute, Norwich, Dept of Virology.
- Oct. 1980 – Sept. 1984: Research fellow at the CNRS University of Perpignan. Plant physiology laboratory.
- From 1984 to December 2006: research director at the CNRS University of Perpignan. Plant Physiology Laboratory – Oct. 1984, in charge of the unit.
- From 1991 to 1995 and from 1999 to 2003: Head of the European Laboratory for Cellular and Molecular Biology of Plants CNRS-UP-CSIC, Perpignan-Barcelona. Father Puigdomenech was in charge of it between 1995 and 1999.
- 1991–1999: Research director 1st class.
- 1986–1998: Director of UMR 5096 from 1999 to 31.12.2006 and of UMR 565.
- 1999–2008: Research director of the exceptional class.
- 2008–2018: Research director emeritus.
- 2018– : Honorary research director emeritus.

=== Administrative responsibilities ===
Delseny was an elected member of the CNRS National Committee for 3 terms of 4 years. He was appointed member of the Institut national de la recherche agronomique (INRA) scientific commissions for 2 terms of 4 years, member of the MICAP scientific council, Mission à la connaissance et à l'amélioration des plantes (CIRAD) for 2 terms, member of the scientific council of the École nationale supérieure d'agronomie de Montpellier from 2002 until the end of 2006, member of the Board of Directors of the ISPMB (International Society for Plant Molecular Biology) from 1998 to 2002 and co-organizer, with Père Puigdomenech, of the ISPMB International Congress in Barcelona in June 2003 and member of the operational board of Génoplante from 1999 to 2004. He is a member of the Environmental Sciences Committee, the Science and Biosafety Committee of the French Academy ofsSciences, the Working Group on Artificial Intelligence and a member of the management board of the Foundation of the University of Perpignan Via Domitia (UPVD) since 2014.

He was co-responsible, with Claude Gigot (IBMC Strasbourg) for the RCP (Cooperative Research on Programme) of the CNRS "Isolation, structure and expression of the nuclear genome of plants" and coordinator of the European EuDicotMap project between 1997 and 2000.

Delseny was also associate editor of Plant Molecular Biology (1996-2006), Plant Cell Physiology (4 years, from 2009 to 2013, then the advisory editorial board until 2017), and Botanical Studies since 2014, co-editor in chief of Plant Science from 2003 to 2015, co-editor in chief of Advance in Botanical Research, from 2006 to 2014, co-editor of CR Biologies (2018-).

He is deputy director of Génopole Montpellier Languedoc-Roussillon (1999-2006), president of CSD 7 (Ecological Agronomy) of the ANR's White Programme (2005-2007), vice-president of COPED (Developing Countries Committee) of the French Academy of sciences (2017-2021).

Finally, he has been the referent of the pilot centre of La Main à la pâte of Perpignan since 2014 and of the Maison pour la Science de Toulouse since 2017 and a member of the scientific council of La Main à la pâte.

== Teaching activities ==
Throughout his career, Delseny has been involved in teaching activities, most often on a voluntary basis at the University of Perpignan. Following Yves Guitton's death in July 1977, he taught biochemistry and plant physiology with his colleague Françoise Grellet in DEUG and master's degree from September 1978 to June 1979, pending the appointment of his replacement, Paul Penon.

Delseny has participated in postgraduate teaching in a significant way: in charge of the "development biology" module of the DEA and then of the master's degree in Montpellier since 1996, until 2007. He was Director of the ED 305 Doctoral School "Biologie environnement sciences pour l'ingénieur" in Perpignan from 2003 to 2006 and a member of the Board of the SIBAGH Doctoral School in Montpellier from 1996 to 2009. He has been a member of the Scientific Council of ED 305 since 2015.

Delseny has participated or organized advanced practical or theoretical courses abroad or in France: Valdivia (Chile), Mar del Plata (Argentina), Bordeaux, Perpignan, Pau, Montpellier, Barcelona, Cabrils (Spain), Hsinchu, Taipei and Tainan (Taiwan).

He has directed, or co-directed, the work of 30 thesis students, as many post-doctoral fellows and foreign visitors and participated in 9 thèses d'État juries, 135 university theses and 25 research authorizations.

== Publications ==
About 200 publications in peer-reviewed journals (Plant Physiology, Plant Journal, Plant Cell, Nature, Planta, European Journal of Biochemistry, FEBS Letters, EMBO J, PNAS, Plant Physiology and Biochemistry, Plant Science...) and numerous popular articles and book chapters (H index 46).

He has participated in 3 patents and has been a guest speaker at hundreds of national and international conferences and has given about 200 seminars, in France and abroad.

== Research ==
Michel Delseny was one of the first scientists to characterize plant RNA messengers in 1974.

He was among the first to show (during his post-doctoral fellowship in 1979–1980) that the Cauliflower Mosaic Virus (CaMV) DNA, after cloning and amplification in Escherichia coli, was infectious and identical to the original DNA when inoculated to a host plant.

He was among the first in France to clone and sequence plant DNA in the early 1980s, and, as such, he helped to organize the community of plant biology researchers in France by creating in 1984 with Claude Gigot (IBMC Strasbourg) the CNRS's RCP (Recherche Coopérative sur Programme) "Isolation, structure et expression du génome nucléaire des plantes" which is at the origin of the development of plant molecular biology in France.

He was the first to report the sequence of the spacer of genes encoding ribosomal RNAs of a dicotyledon in 1988 and to show the bases of ribosomal gene heterogeneity in plants. These observations had a strong impact, as it was the beginning of collaborations with the plant breeding sector at INRA, IRD, CIRAD and with private partners. From there, they developed molecular tools that are still widely used, including microsatellites and RAPDs. The 1990s were marked by their participation in major sequencing programs for Arabidopsis genomes and rice and thus discovered many genes whose function they elucidated. They also discovered in 2000 that plant genomes had undergone global duplication cycles during the evolution of cycles and thus contributed to the current conception of genome evolution. They also characterized the first cassava cDNAs and participated in the sequencing of the unicellular alga Ostreococcus tauri.

Among the genes characterized and discovered in his laboratory are the genes of radish reserve proteins since 1985, the genes of LEA (Late Embryogenesis Abundant) proteins and their regulation, proteins omnipresent in seeds, whose function is undoubtedly to facilitate the survival of the seed during its dehydration, the first gene of a lipid transfer protein in 1988 with Jean-Claude Kader and Père Puigdomenech, then other members of this family involved in the defense against pathogenic fungi, several genes essential for the proper development of embryogenesis, the ABI 5 regulatory gene involved in regulating maturation and seed germination in 2001, several genes involved in controlling ribosomal RNA formation (fibrillarine, nucleolin, snoRNA) and ribosomes that synthesize proteins, several genes involved in lipid biosynthesis in rapeseed, and, recently, one of the genes responsible for the aroma of Basmati rice, as well as the first gene regulating cell death in plants.

Following the discovery by his collaborators of genes encoding small regulatory RNAs (miRNA and siRNA) and for new RNA polymerases, his laboratory is now involved in epigenetics and the control of gene expression by small RNAs. The development of genomics continues there under the leadership of Olivier Panaud.

== Awards ==
- CNRS Bronze medal 1978.
- Elected to the Academia Europaea 1989.
- Elected correspondent of the French Academy of sciences, Institut de France in 1996.
- Elected Fellow American Association for the Advancement of Science (AAAS) in 2003.
- Elected corresponding member of the Institut d'Estudis Catalans (Barcelona) in 2007.
- Grand Prize 2007 of the Fondation Scientifique Franco Taiwanaise awarded by the French Academy of sciences and the NSC (shared with Yue-Ie Hsing, Academia Sinica, Taipei).
- Appointed Chevalier of the Ordre National du Mérite in 20072.
- Appointed Chevalier in the Ordre des Palmes Académiques in 2010, officer in 2015.
- Elected member of the French Academy of sciences, Integrative Biology section, December 2013.
