= Progressive function =

In mathematics, a progressive function ƒ ∈ L^{2}(R) is a function whose Fourier transform is supported by positive frequencies only:

$$\mathop{\rm supp}\hat{f} \subseteq \mathbb{R}_+.$$

It is called super regressive if and only if the time reversed function f(−t) is progressive, or equivalently, if

$$\mathop{\rm supp}\hat{f} \subseteq \mathbb{R}_-.$$

The complex conjugate of a progressive function is regressive, and vice versa.

The space of progressive functions is sometimes denoted $H^2_+(R)$, which is known as the Hardy space of the upper half-plane. This is because a progressive function has the Fourier inversion formula

$$f(t) = \int_0^\infty e^{2\pi i st} \hat f(s)\, ds$$

and hence extends to a holomorphic function on the upper half-plane $\{ t + iu: t, u \in R, u \geq 0 \}$

by the formula

$$f(t+iu) = \int_0^\infty e^{2\pi i s(t+iu)} \hat f(s)\, ds
= \int_0^\infty e^{2\pi i st} e^{-2\pi su} \hat f(s)\, ds.$$

Conversely, every holomorphic function on the upper half-plane which is uniformly square-integrable on every horizontal line will arise in this manner.

Regressive functions are similarly associated with the Hardy space on the lower half-plane $\{ t + iu: t, u \in R, u \leq 0 \}$.
