= Mieczysław Mąkosza =

Polish chemist (1934–2026)

Mieczysław Józef Mąkosza
- Born: 16 November 1934
- Died: 14 January 2026 (aged 91)
- Education: Leningrad University; Warsaw University of Technology
- Known for: Vicarious nucleophilic substitution Phase transfer catalysis
- Scientific career
- Fields: Organic synthesis
- Workplaces: Warsaw University of Technology; Polish Academy of Sciences

Mieczysław Józef Mąkosza (16 November 1934 – 14 January 2026) was a Polish chemist who specialised in organic synthesis and investigation of organic mechanisms. Along with Jerzy Winiarski he is credited for the discovery of the aromatic vicarious nucleophilic substitution, VNS. He also contributed to the discovery of phase transfer catalysis reactions. From 1979 to 2005 he was director of the Institute of Organic Chemistry of the Polish Academy of Sciences. Mąkosza died on 14 January 2026, at the age of 91.
