= Spike-triggered covariance =

Analysis tool for characterizing a neuron's response properties

Spike-triggered covariance (STC) analysis is a tool for characterizing a neuron's response properties using the covariance of stimuli that elicit spikes from a neuron. STC is related to the spike-triggered average (STA), and provides a complementary tool for estimating linear filters in a linear-nonlinear-Poisson (LNP) cascade model. Unlike STA, the STC can be used to identify a multi-dimensional feature space in which a neuron computes its response.

STC analysis identifies the stimulus features affecting a neuron's response via an eigenvector decomposition of the spike-triggered covariance matrix. Eigenvectors with eigenvalues significantly larger or smaller than the eigenvalues of the raw stimulus covariance correspond to stimulus axes along which the neural response is enhanced or suppressed.

STC analysis is similar to principal components analysis (PCA), although it differs in that the eigenvectors corresponding to largest and smallest eigenvalues are used for identifying the feature space. The STC matrix is also known as the 2nd-order Volterra or Wiener kernel.

== Mathematical definition ==
=== Standard STC ===
Let $\mathbf{x_i}$ denote the spatio-temporal stimulus vector preceding the $i$'th time bin, and $y_i$ the spike count in that bin. The stimuli can be assumed to have zero mean (i.e., $E[\mathbf{x}]=0$). If not, it can be transformed to have zero-mean by subtracting the mean stimulus from each vector. The spike-triggered covariance (STC) is given by

$$\operatorname{STC} = \frac{1}{n_{s}-1}\sum_{i=1}^T y_i (\mathbf{x_i}-STA)(\mathbf{x_i}-STA)^T,$$

where $n_s = \sum y_i$ is the total number of spikes, and STA is the spike-triggered average. The covariance of the stimulus is given by

$$\mathrm{C} = \frac 1 {n_p-1}\sum_{i=1}^T \mathbf{x_i}\mathbf{x_i^T},$$

where $n_p$ is the number of stimuli $\mathbf{x_i}$ used during the experiment. The eigenvectors of $(STC-C)$ associated to significantly positive eigenvalues correspond to excitatory vectors, whereas eigenvectors associated to significantly negative eigenvalues are inhibitory eigenvectors.
