= Multidimensional transform =

Mathematical analysis of frequency content of signals

In mathematical analysis and applications, multidimensional transforms are used to analyze the frequency content of signals in a domain of two or more dimensions.

== Multidimensional Fourier transform ==
One of the more popular multidimensional transforms is the Fourier transform, which converts a signal from a time/space domain representation to a frequency domain representation. The discrete-domain multidimensional Fourier transform (FT) can be computed as follows:

$$F(w_1,w_2,\dots,w_m) = \sum_{n_1=-\infty}^\infty \sum_{n_2=-\infty}^\infty \cdots \sum_{n_m=-\infty}^\infty f(n_1,n_2,\dots,n_m) e^{-i w_1 n_1 -i w_2 n_2 \cdots -i w_m n_m}$$

where F stands for the multidimensional Fourier transform, m stands for multidimensional dimension. Define f as a multidimensional discrete-domain signal. The inverse multidimensional Fourier transform is given by

$$f(n_1,n_2,\dots,n_m) = \left(\frac{1}{2 \pi}\right)^m \int_{- \pi}^{\pi} \cdots \int_{-\pi}^{\pi} F(w_1,w_2,\ldots,w_m) e^{i w_1 n_1 +i w_2 n_2 + \cdots+i w_m n_m} \, dw_1 \cdots \,dw_m$$

The multidimensional Fourier transform for continuous-domain signals is defined as follows:

$$F(\Omega_1,\Omega_2,\ldots,\Omega_m) = \int_{-\infty}^{\infty} \cdots \int_{-\infty}^{\infty}
f(t_1,t_2,\ldots,t_m) e^{-i \Omega_1 t_1-i \Omega_2 t_2 \cdots -i \Omega_m t_m} \, dt_1 \cdots \,dt_m$$

=== Properties of Fourier transform ===
Similar properties of the 1-D FT transform apply, but instead of the input parameter being just a single entry, it's a Multi-dimensional (MD) array or vector. Hence, it's x(n_{1},…,n_{M}) instead of x(n).

==== Linearity ====
if $x_1(n_1,\ldots,n_M) \overset{\underset{\mathrm{FT}}{}}{\longleftrightarrow} X_1(\omega_1,\ldots,\omega_M)$ , and $x_2(n_1,\ldots,n_M) \overset{\underset{\mathrm{FT}}{}}{\longleftrightarrow} X_2(\omega_1,\ldots,\omega_M)$ then,

$$a x_1(n_1,\ldots,n_M) + b x_2(n_1,\ldots,n_M) \overset{\underset{\mathrm{FT}}{}}{\longleftrightarrow} a X_1(\omega_1,\ldots,\omega_M) + b X_2 (\omega_1, \ldots, \omega_M)$$

==== Shift ====
if $x(n_1,...,n_M) \overset{\underset{\mathrm{FT}}{}}{\longleftrightarrow} X(\omega_1,...,\omega_M)$, then
$x(n_1 - a_1,...,n_M - a_M) \overset{\underset{\mathrm{FT}}{}}{\longleftrightarrow} e^{-i(\omega_1 a_1 +,...,+ \omega_M a_M)} X(\omega_1,...,\omega_M)$

==== Modulation ====
if $x(n_1,\ldots,n_M) \overset{\underset{\mathrm{FT}}{}}{\longleftrightarrow} X(\omega_1,\ldots,\omega_M)$, then

$$e^{i(\theta_1 n_1 +\cdots+ \theta_M n_M)} x(n_1 - a_1,\ldots,n_M - a_M) \overset{\underset{\mathrm{FT}}{}}{\longleftrightarrow} X(\omega_1 - \theta_1,\ldots,\omega_M - \theta_M)$$

==== Multiplication ====
if $x_1(n_1,\ldots,n_M) \overset{\underset{\mathrm{FT}}{}}{\longleftrightarrow} X_1(\omega_1,\ldots,\omega_M)$, and $x_2(n_1,\ldots,n_M) \overset{\underset{\mathrm{FT}}{}}{\longleftrightarrow} X_2 (\omega_1,\ldots,\omega_M)$

then,

$x_1(n_1,\ldots,n_M) x_2(n_1,\ldots,n_M) \overset{\underset{\mathrm{FT}}{}}{\longleftrightarrow} \frac{1}{(2\pi)^M} \int \limits_{-\pi}^\pi \cdots \int\limits_{-\pi}^\pi X_1(\omega_1 - \theta_1,\ldots,\omega_M - \theta_M) X_2 (\theta_1, \ldots, \theta_M) \, d\theta_1 \cdots d\theta_M$	MD Convolution in Frequency Domain

or,

$x_1(n_1,\ldots,n_M) x_2(n_1,\ldots,n_M) \overset{\underset{\mathrm{FT}}{}}{\longleftrightarrow} \frac{1}{(2\pi)^M} \int\limits_{-\pi}^\pi \cdots \int\limits_{-\pi}^\pi X_1(\theta_1,\ldots,\theta_M) X_2(\omega_1 - \theta_1,\ldots,\omega_M - \theta_M) \, d\theta_1\cdots d\theta_M$	MD Convolution in Frequency Domain

==== Differentiation ====
If $x(n_1,\ldots,n_M) \overset{\underset{\mathrm{FT}}{}}{\longleftrightarrow} X(\omega_1,\ldots,\omega_M)$, then

$$\frac{\partial}{(\partial\omega_1)} x(n_1,\ldots,n_M) \overset{\underset{\mathrm{FT}}{}}{\longleftrightarrow} {-i}n_1 X(\omega_1,\ldots,\omega_M),$$
$$\frac{\partial}{(\partial\omega_2)} x(n_1,\ldots,n_M) \overset{\underset{\mathrm{FT}}{}}{\longleftrightarrow}  {-i}n_2X(\omega_1,\ldots,\omega_M),$$
$$\frac{(\partial)^M}{(\partial\omega_1\partial\omega_2\cdots\partial\omega_M)} x(n_1,\ldots,n_M) \overset{\underset{\mathrm{FT}}{}}{\longleftrightarrow} (-i)^M(n_1n_2\cdots n_M)X(\omega_1,\ldots,\omega_M),$$

==== Transposition ====
If $x(n_1,\ldots,n_M) \overset{\underset{\mathrm{FT}}{}}{\longleftrightarrow} X(\omega_1,\ldots,\omega_M)$, then

$$x(n_M,\ldots,n_1) \overset{\underset{\mathrm{FT}}{}}{\longleftrightarrow} X (\omega_M,\ldots,\omega_1)$$

==== Reflection ====
If $x(n_1,\ldots,n_M) \overset{\underset{\mathrm{FT}}{}}{\longleftrightarrow} X (\omega_1,\ldots,\omega_M)$, then

$$x(\pm n_1,\ldots,\pm n_M) \overset{\underset{\mathrm{FT}}{}}{\longleftrightarrow} X(\pm \omega_1,\ldots,\pm \omega_M)$$

==== Complex conjugation ====
If $x(n_1,\ldots,n_M) \overset{\underset{\mathrm{FT}}{}}{\longleftrightarrow} X(\omega_1,\ldots,\omega_M)$, then

$$x^{*}(\pm n_1,\ldots,\pm n_M) \overset{\underset{\mathrm{FT}}{}}{\longleftrightarrow} X^{*}(\mp \omega_1,\ldots,\mp \omega_M)$$

==== Parseval's theorem (MD) ====
if $x_1(n_1,...,n_M) \overset{\underset{\mathrm{FT}}{}}{\longleftrightarrow} X_1(\omega_1,...,\omega_M)$ , and $x_2(n_1,...,n_M) \overset{\underset{\mathrm{FT}}{}}{\longleftrightarrow} X_2(\omega_1,...,\omega_M)$ then,

$\sum_{n_1=-\infty}^\infty ... \sum_{n_M =-\infty}^\infty x_1 (n_1,...,n_M) x_2^{*}(n_1,...,n_M) {=} \frac{1}{(2\pi)^M} \int\limits_{-\pi}^{\pi} ... \int\limits_{-\pi}^{\pi}X_1(\omega_1,...,\omega_M) X_2^{*}(\omega_1,...,\omega_M)d\omega_1...d\omega_M$

if $x_1(n_1,...,n_M) {=} x_2(n_1,...,n_M)$, then

$\sum_{n_1=-\infty}^\infty ... \sum_{n_M =-\infty}^\infty |x_1 (n_1,...,n_M)|^2 {=} \frac{1}{(2\pi)^M} \int\limits_{-\pi}^{\pi} ... \int\limits_{-\pi}^{\pi}|X_1(\omega_1,...,\omega_M)|^2 d\omega_1...d\omega_M$

A special case of the Parseval's theorem is when the two multi-dimensional signals are the same. In this case, the theorem portrays the energy conservation of the signal and the term in the summation or integral is the energy-density of the signal.

==== Separability ====
A signal or system is said to be separable if it can be expressed as a product of 1-D functions with different independent variables. This phenomenon allows computing the FT transform as a product of 1-D FTs instead of multi-dimensional FT.

if $x(n_1,...,n_M) \overset{\underset{\mathrm{FT}}{}}{\longleftrightarrow} X(\omega_1,...,\omega_M)$, $a(n_1) \overset{\underset{\mathrm{FT}}{}}{\longleftrightarrow} A(\omega_1)$, $b(n_2) \overset{\underset{\mathrm{FT}}{}}{\longleftrightarrow} B(\omega_2)$ ... $y(n_M) \overset{\underset{\mathrm{FT}}{}}{\longleftrightarrow} Y(\omega_M)$, and if $x(n_1,...,n_M) {=} a(n_1)b(n_2)...y(n_M)$, then

$X(\omega_1,...,\omega_M) \overset{\underset{\mathrm{FT}}{}}{\longleftrightarrow} x(n_1,...,n_M) {=} a(n_1)b(n_2)...y(n_M) \overset{\underset{\mathrm{FT}}{}}{\longleftrightarrow} A(\omega_1) B(\omega_2)...Y(\omega_M)$, so

$X(\omega_1,...,\omega_M) {=} A(\omega_1) B(\omega_2)...Y(\omega_M)$

=== MD FFT ===
A fast Fourier transform (FFT) is an algorithm to compute the discrete Fourier transform (DFT) and its inverse. An FFT computes the DFT and produces exactly the same result as evaluating the DFT definition directly; the only difference is that an FFT is much faster. (In the presence of round-off error, many FFT algorithms are also much more accurate than evaluating the DFT definition directly).There are many different FFT algorithms involving a wide range of mathematics, from simple complex-number arithmetic to group theory and number theory. See more in FFT.

=== MD DFT ===
The multidimensional discrete Fourier transform (DFT) is a sampled version of the discrete-domain FT by evaluating it at sample frequencies that are uniformly spaced. The N_{1} × N_{2} × ... N_{m} DFT is given by:

$$Fx(K_1,K_2,\ldots,K_m)= \sum_{n_1=0}^{N_1-1} \cdots \sum_{n_m=0}^{N_m-1} fx(n_1,n_2,\ldots,n_m) e^{-i \frac{2 \pi}{N_1} n_1 K_1  -i \frac{2 \pi}{N_2} n_2 K_2 \cdots -i \frac{2 \pi}{N_m} n_m K_m}$$

for 0 ≤ K_{i} ≤ N_{i} − 1, i = 1, 2, ..., m.

The inverse multidimensional DFT equation is

$$fx(n_1,n_2,\ldots,n_m)= \frac{1}{N_1 \cdots N_m} \sum_{K_1=0}^{N_1-1} \cdots \sum_{K_m=0}^{N_m-1} Fx(K_1,K_2, \ldots ,K_m) e^{i \frac{2 \pi}{N_1} n_1 K_1 +i \frac{2 \pi}{N_2}  n_2 K_2\cdots+i \frac{2 \pi}{N_m} n_m K_m}$$

for 0 ≤ n_{1}, n_{2}, ... , n_{m} ≤ N_{(1, 2, ... , m)} – 1.

== Multidimensional discrete cosine transform ==
The discrete cosine transform (DCT) is used in a wide range of applications such as data compression, feature extraction, Image reconstruction, multi-frame detection and so on. The multidimensional DCT is given by:

$$Fx(K_1,K_2,\ldots,K_r ) = \sum_{n_1=0}^{N_1-1} \sum_{n_2=0}^{N_2-1} \cdots \sum_{n_r=0}^{N_r-1} fx(n_1,n_2,\ldots,n_r) \cos { \frac{ \pi (2n_1+1) K_1}{2N_1}} \cdots \cos { \frac{ \pi (2n_r+1) K_r}{2N_r}}$$

for k_{i} = 0, 1, ..., N_{i} − 1, i = 1, 2, ..., r.

== Multidimensional Laplace transform ==
The multidimensional Laplace transform is useful for the solution of boundary value problems. Boundary value problems in two or more variables characterized by partial differential equations can be solved by a direct use of the Laplace transform. The Laplace transform for an M-dimensional case is defined as

$F(s_1,s_2,\ldots,s_n) = \int_{0}^{\infty} \cdots \int_{0}^{\infty} f(t_1,t_2,\ldots,t_n) e^{-s_nt_n -s_{n-1}t_{n-1} \cdots \cdots s_1t_1} \, dt_1 \cdots \,dt_n$

where F stands for the s-domain representation of the signal f(t).

A special case (along 2 dimensions) of the multi-dimensional Laplace transform of function f(x,y) is defined as

$$F(s_1,s_2)= \int\limits_{0}^{\infty}\int\limits_{0}^{\infty}\ f(x,y) e^{-s_1x-s_2y}\, dxdy$$

$F(s_1,s_2)$ is called the image of $f(x,y)$ and $f(x,y)$ is known as the original of $F(s_1,s_2)$. This special case can be used to solve the Telegrapher's equations.

== Multidimensional Z transform ==
The multidimensional Z transform is used to map the discrete time domain multidimensional signal to the Z domain. This can be used to check the stability of filters. The equation of the multidimensional Z transform is given by

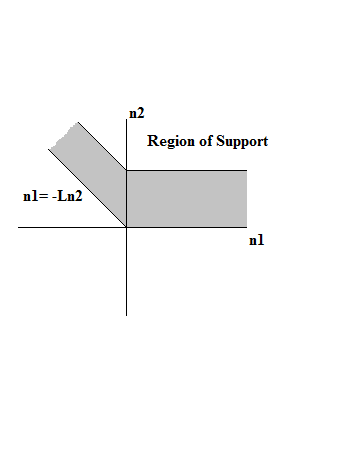
Figure 1.1a

$F(z_1,z_2,\ldots,z_m)= \sum_{n_1=-\infty}^{\infty} \cdots \sum_{n_m=-\infty}^{\infty} f(n_1,n_2,\ldots,n_m) z_1^{-n_1} z_2^{-n_2} \ldots z_m^{-n_m}$

where F stands for the z-domain representation of the signal f(n).

A special case of the multidimensional Z transform is the 2D Z transform which is given as

$F(z_1,z_2)= \sum_{n_1=-\infty}^{\infty} \sum_{n_2=-\infty}^{\infty} f(n_1,n_2) z_1^{-n_1} z_2^{-n_2}$

The Fourier transform is a special case of the Z transform evaluated along the unit circle (in 1D) and unit bi-circle (in 2D). i.e. at

$z=e^{iw}$ where z and w are vectors.

=== Region of convergence ===
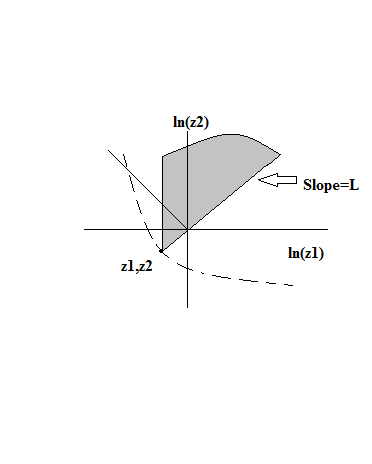
Figure 1.1b

Points (z_{1},z_{2}) for which $F(z_1,z_2)=\sum_{n_1=-\infty}^\infty \sum_{n_2=-\infty}^\infty |f(n_1,n_2)| |z_1|^{-n_1} |z_2|^{-n_2}$ $<\infty$ are located in the ROC.

An example:

If a sequence has a support as shown in Figure 1.1a, then its ROC is shown in Figure 1.1b. This follows that |F(z_{1},z_{2})| < ∞ .

$(z_{01},z_{02})$ lies in the ROC, then all points$(z_1,z_2)$that satisfy |z1|≥|z01| and |z2|≥|z02| lie in the ROC.

Therefore, for figure 1.1a and 1.1b, the ROC would be

$$\ln|z_1| \ge \ln|z_{01}| \text{ and } \ln|z_2| \ge L \ln|z_1| + \{ \ln|z_{02}| - L\ln|z_{01}| \}$$

where L is the slope.

The 2D Z-transform, similar to the Z-transform, is used in multidimensional signal processing to relate a two-dimensional discrete-time signal to the complex frequency domain in which the 2D surface in 4D space that the Fourier transform lies on is known as the unit surface or unit bicircle.

== Applications ==
The DCT and DFT are often used in signal processing and image processing, and they are also used to efficiently solve partial differential equations by spectral methods. The DFT can also be used to perform other operations such as convolutions or multiplying large integers. The DFT and DCT have seen wide usage across a large number of fields, we only sketch a few examples below.

=== Image processing ===
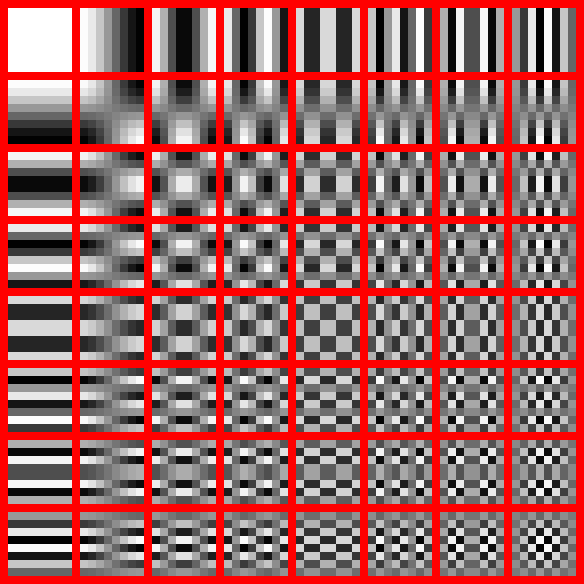
Two-dimensional DCT frequencies from the JPEG DCT

The DCT is used in JPEG image compression, MJPEG, MPEG, DV, Daala, and Theora video compression. There, the two-dimensional DCT-II of NxN blocks are computed and the results are quantized and entropy coded. In this case, N is typically 8 and the DCT-II formula is applied to each row and column of the block. The result is an 8x8 transform coefficient array in which the: (0,0) element (top-left) is the DC (zero-frequency) component and entries with increasing vertical and horizontal index values represent higher vertical and horizontal spatial frequencies, as shown in the picture on the right.

In image processing, one can also analyze and describe unconventional cryptographic methods based on 2D DCTs, for inserting non-visible binary watermarks into the 2D image plane, and According to different orientations, the 2-D directional DCT-DWT hybrid transform can be applied in denoising ultrasound images. 3D DCT can also be used to transform video data or 3D image data in watermark embedding schemes in transform domain.

=== Spectral analysis ===
When the DFT is used for spectral analysis, the {x_{n}} sequence usually represents a finite set of uniformly spaced time-samples of some signal x(t) where t represents time. The conversion from continuous time to samples (discrete-time) changes the underlying Fourier transform of x(t) into a discrete-time Fourier transform (DTFT), which generally entails a type of distortion called aliasing. Choice of an appropriate sample-rate (see Nyquist rate) is the key to minimizing that distortion. Similarly, the conversion from a very long (or infinite) sequence to a manageable size entails a type of distortion called leakage, which is manifested as a loss of detail (a.k.a. resolution) in the DTFT. Choice of an appropriate sub-sequence length is the primary key to minimizing that effect. When the available data (and time to process it) is more than the amount needed to attain the desired frequency resolution, a standard technique is to perform multiple DFTs, for example to create a spectrogram. If the desired result is a power spectrum and noise or randomness is present in the data, averaging the magnitude components of the multiple DFTs is a useful procedure to reduce the variance of the spectrum (also called a periodogram in this context); two examples of such techniques are the Welch method and the Bartlett method; the general subject of estimating the power spectrum of a noisy signal is called spectral estimation.

A final source of distortion (or perhaps illusion) is the DFT itself, because it is just a discrete sampling of the DTFT, which is a function of a continuous frequency domain. That can be mitigated by increasing the resolution of the DFT. That procedure is illustrated at § Sampling the DTFT.

- The procedure is sometimes referred to as zero-padding, which is a particular implementation used in conjunction with the fast Fourier transform (FFT) algorithm. The inefficiency of performing multiplications and additions with zero-valued "samples" is more than offset by the inherent efficiency of the FFT.
- As already noted, leakage imposes a limit on the inherent resolution of the DTFT. So there is a practical limit to the benefit that can be obtained from a fine-grained DFT.

=== Partial differential equations ===
Discrete Fourier transforms are often used to solve partial differential equations, where again the DFT is used as an approximation for the Fourier series (which is recovered in the limit of infinite N). The advantage of this approach is that it expands the signal in complex exponentials e^{inx}, which are eigenfunctions of differentiation: d/dx e^{inx} = in e^{inx}. Thus, in the Fourier representation, differentiation is simple—we just multiply by i n. (Note, however, that the choice of n is not unique due to aliasing; for the method to be convergent, a choice similar to that in the trigonometric interpolation section above should be used.) A linear differential equation with constant coefficients is transformed into an easily solvable algebraic equation. One then uses the inverse DFT to transform the result back into the ordinary spatial representation. Such an approach is called a spectral method.

DCTs are also widely employed in solving partial differential equations by spectral methods, where the different variants of the DCT correspond to slightly different even/odd boundary conditions at the two ends of the array.

Laplace transforms are used to solve partial differential equations. The general theory for obtaining solutions in this technique is developed by theorems on Laplace transform in n dimensions.

The multidimensional Z transform can also be used to solve partial differential equations.

=== Image processing for arts surface analysis by FFT ===
One very important factor is that we must apply a non-destructive method to obtain those rare valuables information (from the HVS viewing point, is focused in whole colorimetric and spatial information) about works of art and zero-damage on them. We can understand the arts by looking at a color change or by measuring the surface uniformity change. Since the whole image will be very huge, so we use a double raised cosine window to truncate the image:

$$w(x,y)=\frac{1}{4} \left(1 + \cos {\frac {x \pi} N }\right)\left(1 + \cos {\frac{y \pi} N }\right)$$

where N is the image dimension and x, y are the coordinates from the center of image spans from 0 to N/2. The author wanted to compute an equal value for spatial frequency such as:

$$\begin{align}
A_m(f)^2= \left[ \sum_{i=-f}^f \right. & \operatorname{FFT}(-f,i)^2+ \sum_{i=-f}^f \operatorname{FFT}(f,i)^2 \\[5pt]
& \left. {} + \sum_{i=-f+1}^{f-1} \operatorname{FFT}(i,-f)^2+ \sum_{i=-f+1}^{f-1} \operatorname{FFT}(i,f)^2 \right]
\end{align}$$

where "FFT" denotes the fast Fourier transform, and f is the spatial frequency spans from 0 to N/2 – 1. The proposed FFT-based imaging approach is diagnostic technology to ensure a long life and stable to culture arts. This is a simple, cheap which can be used in museums without affecting their daily use. But this method doesn’t allow a quantitative measure of the corrosion rate.

=== Application to weakly nonlinear circuit simulation ===
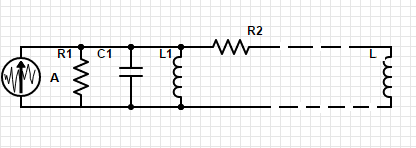
An example of a weakly nonlinear circuit

The inverse multidimensional Laplace transform can be applied to simulate nonlinear circuits. This is done so by formulating a circuit as a state-space and expanding the Inverse Laplace Transform based on Laguerre function expansion.

The Laguerre method can be used to simulate a weakly nonlinear circuit and the Laguerre method can invert a multidimensional Laplace transform efficiently with a high accuracy.

It is observed that a high accuracy and significant speedup can be achieved for simulating large nonlinear circuits using multidimensional Laplace transforms.

== See also ==
- Discrete cosine transform
- List of Fourier-related transforms
- List of Fourier analysis topics
- Multidimensional discrete convolution
- 2D Z-transform
- Multidimensional empirical mode decomposition
- Multidimensional signal reconstruction
