= Wiener series =

In mathematics, the Wiener series, or Wiener G-functional expansion, originates from the 1958 book of Norbert Wiener. It is an orthogonal expansion for nonlinear functionals closely related to the Volterra series and having the same relation to it as an orthogonal Hermite polynomial expansion has to a power series. For this reason it is also known as the Wiener–Hermite expansion. The analogue of the coefficients are referred to as Wiener kernels. The terms of the series are orthogonal (uncorrelated) with respect to a statistical input of white noise. This property allows the terms to be identified in applications by the Lee–Schetzen method.

The Wiener series is important in nonlinear system identification. In this context, the series approximates the functional relation of the output to the entire history of system input at any time. The Wiener series has been applied mostly to the identification of biological systems, especially in neuroscience.

The name Wiener series is almost exclusively used in system theory. In the mathematical literature it occurs as the Itô expansion (1951) which has a different form but is entirely equivalent to it.

The Wiener series should not be confused with the Wiener filter, which is another algorithm developed by Norbert Wiener used in signal processing.

== Wiener G-functional expressions ==
Given a system with an input/output pair $(x(t),y(t))$ where the input is white noise with zero mean value and power A, we can write the output of the system as sum of a series of Wiener G-functionals $y(n) = \sum_p (G_p x)(n)$

In the following the expressions of the G-functionals up to the fifth order will be given:

{{Clarify}}

$$(G_0 x)(n) = k_0  = E\left\{ y(n) \right\};$$

$$(G_1 x)(n) = \sum_{\tau _1  = 0}^{N_1  - 1} k_1 (\tau _1 )x(n - \tau _1 );$$

$$(G_2 x)(n) = \sum_{\tau _1, \tau_2 = 0}^{N_2  - 1} k_2 (\tau _1 ,\tau _2 )x(n - \tau _1 )x(n - \tau _2) - A\sum_{\tau _1  = 0}^{N_2  - 1} k_2 (\tau _1 ,\tau _1 );$$

$$(G_3 x)(n) = \sum_{\tau _1,\ldots,\tau_3  = 0}^{N_3  - 1} k_3 (\tau _1 ,\tau _2 ,\tau _3 ) x(n - \tau _1 )x(n - \tau _2)x(n - \tau _3)
- 3A \sum_{\tau _1  = 0}^{N_3  - 1} \sum_{\tau _2  = 0}^{N_3  - 1}k_3 (\tau _1 ,\tau _2 ,\tau _2 ) x(n - \tau _1 );$$

$$\begin{align}
(G_4 x)(n) = {} &  \sum_{\tau_1,\ldots,\tau_4  = 0}^{N_4  - 1} k_4 (\tau_1 ,\tau_2 ,\tau_3 ,\tau_4 )
x(n - \tau_1 )x(n - \tau_2 )x(n - \tau_3 )x(n - \tau_4 )  + {} \\[6pt]
& {} - 6A \sum_{\tau _1,\tau _2 = 0}^{N_4  - 1} \sum_{\tau_3 = 0}^{N_4  - 1} k_4 (\tau_1, \tau_2, \tau_3 ,\tau_3) x(n - \tau_1 )x(n - \tau_2) + 3A^2 \sum_{\tau_1,\tau_2  = 0}^{N_4  - 1} k_4 (\tau_1 ,\tau_1 ,\tau_2 ,\tau_2 ) ;
\end{align}$$

$$\begin{align}
(G_5 x)(n) = {} & \sum_{\tau _1,\ldots,\tau _5  = 0}^{N_5  - 1} k_5 (\tau_1, \tau_2, \tau_3, \tau_4, \tau_5 )
x(n - \tau_1 )x(n - \tau_2 )x(n - \tau_3 )x(n - \tau_4 )x(n - \tau_5 ) + {} \\[6pt]
& {} - 10A\sum_{\tau _1,\ldots,\tau _3  = 0}^{N_5  - 1} \sum_{\tau _4  = 0}^{N_5  - 1} k_5 (\tau_1, \tau _2 ,\tau_3, \tau_4, \tau_4 ) x(n - \tau_1 )x(n - \tau_2 )x(n - \tau_3 ) \\[6pt]
& {} + 15A^2 \sum_{\tau _1  = 0}^{N_5  - 1} \sum_{\tau_2,\tau_3  = 0}^{N_5  - 1} k_5 (\tau_1, \tau_2, \tau_2 ,\tau_3 ,\tau_3 ) x(n - \tau_1 ).
\end{align}$$

== See also ==
- Volterra series
- System identification
- Spike-triggered average
