= Parabolic =

Parabolic usually refers to something in a shape of a parabola, but may also refer to a parable.

Parabolic may refer to:

- In mathematics:
  - In elementary mathematics, especially elementary geometry:
  - Parabolic coordinates
  - Parabolic cylindrical coordinates
  - parabolic Möbius transformation
  - Parabolic geometry (disambiguation)
  - Parabolic spiral
  - Parabolic line
  - In advanced mathematics:
    - Parabolic cylinder function
    - Parabolic induction
    - Parabolic Lie algebra
    - Parabolic partial differential equation
- In physics:
  - Parabolic trajectory
- In technology:
  - Parabolic antenna
  - Parabolic microphone
  - Parabolic reflector
  - Parabolic trough - a type of solar thermal energy collector
  - Parabolic flight - a way of achieving weightlessness
  - Parabolic action, or parabolic bending curve - a term often used to refer to a progressive bending curve in fishing rods.
- In commodities and stock markets:
  - Parabolic SAR - a chart pattern in which prices rise or fall with an increasingly steeper slope
- Other
  - Parabolic dune, a sand formation
