= Paraboloidal coordinates =

Three-dimensional orthogonal coordinate system

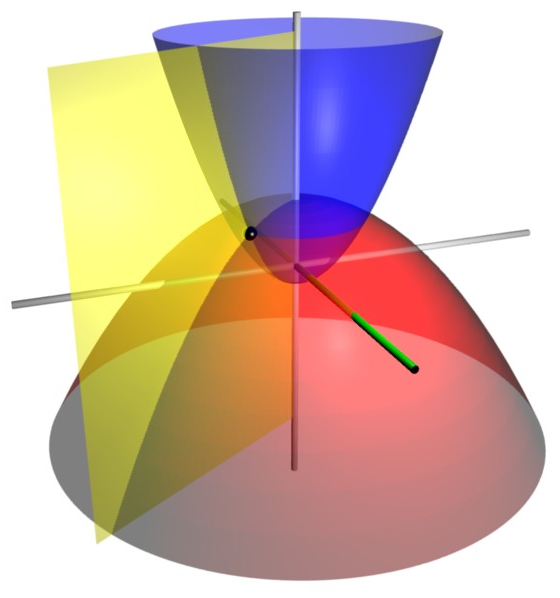
Parabolic coordinates 3D

Paraboloidal coordinates are three-dimensional orthogonal coordinates $(\mu, \nu, \lambda)$ that generalize two-dimensional parabolic coordinates. They possess elliptic paraboloids as one-coordinate surfaces. As such, they should be distinguished from parabolic cylindrical coordinates and parabolic rotational coordinates, both of which are also generalizations of two-dimensional parabolic coordinates. The coordinate surfaces of the former are parabolic cylinders, and the coordinate surfaces of the latter are circular paraboloids.

Differently from cylindrical and rotational parabolic coordinates, but similarly to the related ellipsoidal coordinates, the coordinate surfaces of the paraboloidal coordinate system are not produced by rotating or projecting any two-dimensional orthogonal coordinate system.

== Basic formulas ==
The Cartesian coordinates $(x, y, z)$ can be produced from the ellipsoidal coordinates $(\mu, \nu, \lambda)$ by the equations

$$x^{2} = \frac{4}{b-c}(\mu - b)(b - \nu)(b - \lambda)$$

$$y^{2} = \frac{4}{b-c}(\mu - c)(c - \nu)(\lambda - c)$$

$$z = \mu + \nu + \lambda - b - c$$

with

$$\mu > b > \lambda > c > \nu > 0$$

Consequently, surfaces of constant $\mu$ are downward opening elliptic paraboloids:

$$\frac{x^2}{\mu - b} + \frac{y^2}{\mu - c} = -4 (z - \mu)$$

Similarly, surfaces of constant $\nu$ are upward opening elliptic paraboloids,

$$\frac{x^2}{b - \nu} + \frac{y^2}{c - \nu} = 4 (z - \nu)$$

whereas surfaces of constant $\lambda$ are hyperbolic paraboloids:

$$\frac{x^2}{b - \lambda} - \frac{y^2}{\lambda - c} = 4 (z - \lambda)$$

== Scale factors ==
The scale factors for the paraboloidal coordinates $(\mu, \nu, \lambda)$ are

$$h_{\mu} = \left[ \frac{\left(\mu - \nu \right) \left(\mu - \lambda \right)}{ \left(\mu - b \right) \left(\mu - c \right)} \right]^{1/2}$$

$$h_{\nu} = \left[\frac{\left(\mu - \nu \right) \left( \lambda - \nu \right)}{ \left(b - \nu \right) \left(c - \nu \right)} \right]^{1/2}$$

$$h_{\lambda} = \left[\frac{\left(\lambda - \nu \right) \left(\mu - \lambda \right)}{ \left(b - \lambda \right) \left(\lambda - c \right)} \right]^{1/2}$$

Hence, the infinitesimal volume element is

$$dV = \frac{(\mu - \nu)(\mu - \lambda)(\lambda - \nu)}{\left[(\mu - b)(\mu - c)(b - \nu)(c - \nu)(b - \lambda)(\lambda - c) \right]^{1/2}} \  d\lambda d\mu d\nu$$

== Differential operators ==
Common differential operators can be expressed in the coordinates $(\mu, \nu, \lambda)$ by substituting the scale factors into the general formulas for these operators, which are applicable to any three-dimensional orthogonal coordinates. For instance, the gradient operator is

$$\nabla = \left[\frac{ \left(\mu - b \right) \left(\mu - c \right)}{\left(\mu - \nu \right) \left(\mu - \lambda \right)} \right]^{1/2} \mathbf{e}_{\mu} \frac{\partial}{\partial \mu} + \left[\frac{\left(b - \nu \right) \left(c - \nu \right)}{\left(\mu - \nu \right) \left( \lambda - \nu \right)} \right]^{1/2} \mathbf{e}_{\nu} \frac{\partial}{\partial \nu} + \left[\frac{\left(b - \lambda \right) \left(\lambda - c \right)}{\left(\lambda - \nu \right) \left(\mu - \lambda \right)} \right]^{1/2} \mathbf{e}_{\lambda} \frac{\partial}{\partial \lambda}$$

and the Laplacian is

$$\begin{align}
\nabla^2 = &\left[\frac{ \left(\mu - b \right) \left(\mu - c \right)}{\left(\mu - \nu \right) \left(\mu - \lambda \right)} \right]^{1/2} \frac{\partial}{\partial \mu} \left[(\mu - b)^{1/2}(\mu - c)^{1/2} \frac{\partial}{\partial \mu} \right] \\
&+ \left[\frac{\left(b - \nu \right) \left(c - \nu \right)}{\left(\mu - \nu \right) \left( \lambda - \nu \right)} \right]^{1/2} \frac{\partial}{\partial \nu} \left[ (b - \nu)^{1/2}(c - \nu)^{1/2}\frac{\partial}{\partial \nu} \right] \\
&+ \left[\frac{\left(b - \lambda \right) \left(\lambda - c \right)}{\left(\lambda - \nu \right) \left(\mu - \lambda \right)} \right]^{1/2} \frac{\partial}{\partial \lambda} \left[(b - \lambda)^{1/2}(\lambda -c)^{1/2} \frac{\partial}{\partial \lambda} \right]
\end{align}$$

== Applications ==
Paraboloidal coordinates can be useful for solving certain partial differential equations. For instance, the Laplace equation and Helmholtz equation are both separable in paraboloidal coordinates. Hence, the coordinates can be used to solve these equations in geometries with paraboloidal symmetry, i.e. with boundary conditions specified on sections of paraboloids.

The Helmholtz equation is $(\nabla^2 + k^2) \psi = 0$. Taking $\psi = M(\mu)N(\nu)\Lambda(\lambda)$, the separated equations are

$$\begin{align}
&(\mu - b)(\mu - c) \frac{d^2M}{d\mu^2} + \frac{1}{2}\left[2 \mu - (b + c) \right] \frac{dM}{d\mu} + \left[k^2 \mu^2 + \alpha_3 \mu - \alpha_2\right] M = 0 \\
&(b - \nu)(c - \nu) \frac{d^2N}{d\nu^2} + \frac{1}{2}\left[2 \nu - (b + c) \right] \frac{dN}{d\nu} + \left[k^2 \nu^2 + \alpha_3 \nu - \alpha_2\right] N = 0 \\
&(b - \lambda)(\lambda - c) \frac{d^2\Lambda}{d\lambda^2} - \frac{1}{2}\left[2 \lambda - (b + c) \right] \frac{d\Lambda}{d\lambda} - \left[k^2 \lambda^2 + \alpha_3 \lambda - \alpha_2\right] \Lambda = 0 \\
\end{align}$$

where $\alpha_2$ and $\alpha_3$ are the two separation constants. Similarly, the separated equations for the Laplace equation can be obtained by setting $k = 0$ in the above.

Each of the separated equations can be cast in the form of the Baer equation. Direct solution of the equations is difficult, however, in part because the separation constants $\alpha_2$ and $\alpha_3$ appear simultaneously in all three equations.

Following the above approach, paraboloidal coordinates have been used to solve for the electric field surrounding a conducting paraboloid.

== Bibliography ==
- Lew Yan Voon LC, Willatzen M (2011). Separable Boundary-Value Problems in Physics. Wiley-VCH. ISBN 978-3-527-41020-0.
- Morse PM, Feshbach H (1953). Methods of Theoretical Physics, Part I. New York: McGraw-Hill. p. 664. ISBN 0-07-043316-X. LCCN 52011515.
- Margenau H, Murphy GM (1956). The Mathematics of Physics and Chemistry. New York: D. van Nostrand. pp. 184–185. LCCN 55010911.
- Korn GA, Korn TM (1961). Mathematical Handbook for Scientists and Engineers. New York: McGraw-Hill. p. 180. LCCN 59014456. ASIN B0000CKZX7.
- Arfken G (1970). Mathematical Methods for Physicists (2nd ed.). Orlando, FL: Academic Press. pp. 119–120.
- Sauer R, Szabó I (1967). Mathematische Hilfsmittel des Ingenieurs. New York: Springer Verlag. p. 98. LCCN 67025285.
- Zwillinger D (1992). Handbook of Integration. Boston, MA: Jones and Bartlett. p. 114. ISBN 0-86720-293-9. Same as Morse & Feshbach (1953), substituting u_{k} for ξ_{k}.
- Moon P, Spencer DE (1988). "Paraboloidal Coordinates (μ, ν, λ)". Field Theory Handbook, Including Coordinate Systems, Differential Equations, and Their Solutions (corrected 2nd ed., 3rd print ed.). New York: Springer-Verlag. pp. 44–48 (Table 1.11). ISBN 978-0-387-18430-2.
