= Baer function =

Special functions occurring in mathematical physics

Baer functions $B_p^q(z)$ and $C_p^q(z)$, named after Karl Baer, are solutions of the Baer differential equation

$$\frac{d^2B}{dz^2} + \frac{1}{2}\left[\frac{1}{z-b} + \frac{1}{z-c} \right]\frac{dB}{dz} - \left[\frac{p(p+1)z + q(b+c)}{(z-b)(z-c)} \right]B = 0$$

which arises when separation of variables is applied to the Laplace equation in paraboloidal coordinates. The Baer functions are defined as the series solutions about $z = 0$ which satisfy $B_p^q(0) = 0$, $C_p^q(0) = 1$. By substituting a power series Ansatz into the differential equation, formal series can be constructed for the Baer functions. For special values of $p$ and $q$, simpler solutions may exist. For instance,

$$B_0^0(z) = \ln \left[ \frac{z+\sqrt{(z-b)(z-c)}-(b+c)/2}{\sqrt{bc} - (b+c)/2} \right]$$

Moreover, Mathieu functions are special-case solutions of the Baer equation, since the latter reduces to the Mathieu differential equation when $b = 0$ and $c = 1$, and making the change of variable $z = \cos^2 t$.

Like the Mathieu differential equation, the Baer equation has two regular singular points (at $z = b$ and $z = c$), and one irregular singular point at infinity. Thus, in contrast with many other special functions of mathematical physics, Baer functions cannot in general be expressed in terms of hypergeometric functions.

The Baer wave equation is a generalization which results from separating variables in the Helmholtz equation in paraboloidal coordinates:

$$\frac{d^2B}{dz^2} + \frac{1}{2}\left[\frac{1}{z-b} + \frac{1}{z-c} \right]\frac{dB}{dz} + \left[\frac{k^2 z^2 - p(p+1)z - q(b+c)}{(z-b)(z-c)} \right]B = 0$$

which reduces to the original Baer equation when $k = 0$.

== Bibliography ==
- Lew Yan Voon LC, Willatzen M (2011). Separable Boundary-Value Problems in Physics. Wiley-VCH. doi:10.1002/9783527634927. ISBN 978-3-527-41020-0. (free online access to the appendix on Baer functions)
- Parry Moon; Domina E. Spencer (6 December 2012). Field Theory Handbook: Including Coordinate Systems, Differential Equations and Their Solutions. Springer. ISBN 978-3-642-53060-9.
- Duggen, L; Willatzen, M; Voon, L C Lew Yan (2012), "Laplace boundary-value problem in paraboloidal coordinates", European Journal of Physics, 33 (3): 689–696, Bibcode:2012EJPh...33..689D, doi:10.1088/0143-0807/33/3/689, S2CID 120466280
