= Covariance (disambiguation) =

In mathematics and physics, covariance is a measure of how much two variables change together, and may refer to:

== Statistics ==
- Covariance matrix, a matrix of covariances between a number of variables
- Covariance or cross-covariance between two random variables or data sets
- Autocovariance, the covariance of a signal with a time-shifted version of itself
- Covariance function, a function giving the covariance of a random field with itself at two locations

== Algebra and geometry ==
- A covariant (invariant theory) is a bihomogeneous polynomial in x, y, ... and the coefficients of some homogeneous form in x, y, ... that is invariant under some group of linear transformations.
- Covariance and contravariance of vectors, properties of how vector coordinates change under a change of basis
  - Covariant transformation, a rule that describes how certain physical entities change under a change of coordinate system
- Covariance and contravariance of functors, properties of functors
- General covariance or simply covariance (inaccurate but common usage in quantum mechanics), the invariance of the mathematical form of physical laws under arbitrary differential coordinate transformations (including Lorentz transformations), strictly meaning invariance
- Lorentz covariance, a property of space-time that follows from the special theory of relativity
  - Poincaré covariance, a related property
- Eddy covariance, an atmospheric flux measurement technique
- in category theory, covariant functor, the same as a functor (the term is used to be in contrast to the term contravariant functor).

== Computer science ==
- Covariance and contravariance (computer science), a system of class relations in computer science

== See also ==
- Covariance and correlation
- Covariance and contravariance (disambiguation)
