= Parabolic coordinates =

Two-dimensional orthogonal coordinate system

In green, confocal parabolae opening upwards, $2y = \frac {x^2}{\sigma^2}-\sigma^2$ In red, confocal parabolae opening downwards, $2y =-\frac{x^2}{\tau^2}+\tau^2$

Parabolic coordinates are a two-dimensional orthogonal coordinate system in which the coordinate lines are confocal parabolas. A three-dimensional version of parabolic coordinates is obtained by rotating the two-dimensional system about the symmetry axis of the parabolas.

Parabolic coordinates have found many applications, e.g., the treatment of the Stark effect and the potential theory of the edges.

== Two-dimensional parabolic coordinates ==
Two-dimensional parabolic coordinates $(\sigma, \tau)$ are defined by the equations, in terms of Cartesian coordinates:

$$x = \sigma \tau$$

$$y = \frac{1}{2} \left( \tau^{2} - \sigma^{2} \right)$$

The curves of constant $\sigma$ form confocal parabolae

$$2y = \frac{x^{2}}{\sigma^{2}} - \sigma^{2}$$

that open upwards (i.e., towards $+y$), whereas the curves of constant $\tau$ form confocal parabolae

$$2y = -\frac{x^{2}}{\tau^{2}} + \tau^{2}$$

that open downwards (i.e., towards $-y$). The foci of all these parabolae are located at the origin.

The Cartesian coordinates $x$ and $y$ can be converted to parabolic coordinates by:

$$\sigma = \operatorname{sign}(x)\sqrt{\sqrt{x^{2} +y^{2}}-y}$$

$$\tau = \sqrt{\sqrt{x^{2} +y^{2}}+y}$$

== Two-dimensional scale factors ==
The scale factors for the parabolic coordinates $(\sigma, \tau)$ are equal

$$h_{\sigma} = h_{\tau} = \sqrt{\sigma^{2} + \tau^{2}}$$

Hence, the infinitesimal element of area is

$$dA = \left( \sigma^{2} + \tau^{2} \right) d\sigma d\tau$$

and the Laplacian equals

$$\nabla^{2} \Phi = \frac{1}{\sigma^{2} + \tau^{2}}
\left(  \frac{\partial^{2} \Phi}{\partial \sigma^{2}} +
\frac{\partial^{2} \Phi}{\partial \tau^{2}} \right)$$

Other differential operators such as $\nabla \cdot \mathbf{F}$ and $\nabla \times \mathbf{F}$ can be expressed in the coordinates $(\sigma, \tau)$ by substituting the scale factors into the general formulae found in orthogonal coordinates.

== Three-dimensional parabolic coordinates ==
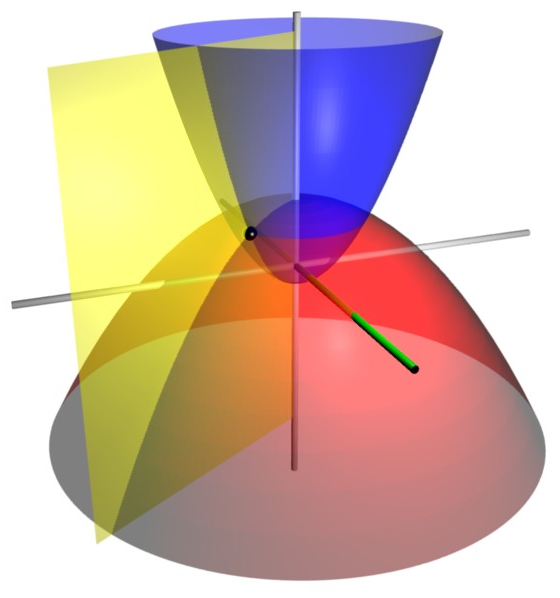
Coordinate surfaces of the three-dimensional parabolic coordinates. The red paraboloid corresponds to τ=2, the blue paraboloid corresponds to σ=1, and the yellow half-plane corresponds to φ=−60°. The three surfaces intersect at the point P (shown as a black sphere) with Cartesian coordinates roughly (1.0, −1.732, 1.5).

The two-dimensional parabolic coordinates form the basis for two sets of three-dimensional orthogonal coordinates. The parabolic cylindrical coordinates are produced by projecting in the $z$-direction. Rotation about the symmetry axis of the parabolae produces a set of confocal paraboloids, the coordinate system of tridimensional parabolic coordinates. Expressed in terms of cartesian coordinates:

$$x = \sigma \tau \cos \varphi$$

$$y = \sigma \tau \sin \varphi$$

$$z = \frac{1}{2} \left(\tau^{2} - \sigma^{2} \right)$$

where the parabolae are now aligned with the $z$-axis, about which the rotation was carried out. Hence, the azimuthal angle $\varphi$ is defined

$$\tan \varphi = \frac{y}{x}$$

The surfaces of constant $\sigma$ form confocal paraboloids

$$2z = \frac{x^{2} + y^{2}}{\sigma^{2}} - \sigma^{2}$$

that open upwards (i.e., towards $+z$) whereas the surfaces of constant $\tau$ form confocal paraboloids

$$2z = -\frac{x^{2} + y^{2}}{\tau^{2}} + \tau^{2}$$

that open downwards (i.e., towards $-z$). The foci of all these paraboloids are located at the origin.

The Riemannian metric tensor associated with this coordinate system is

$$g_{ij} = \begin{bmatrix} \sigma^2+\tau^2 & 0 & 0\\0 & \sigma^2+\tau^2 & 0\\0 & 0  & \sigma^2\tau^2 \end{bmatrix}$$

== Three-dimensional scale factors ==
The three dimensional scale factors are:

$$h_{\sigma} = \sqrt{\sigma^2+\tau^2}$$
$$h_{\tau}   = \sqrt{\sigma^2+\tau^2}$$
$$h_{\varphi} = \sigma\tau$$

It is seen that the scale factors $h_{\sigma}$ and $h_{\tau}$ are the same as in the two-dimensional case. The infinitesimal volume element is then

$$dV = h_\sigma h_\tau h_\varphi\, d\sigma\,d\tau\,d\varphi = \sigma\tau \left( \sigma^{2} + \tau^{2} \right)\,d\sigma\,d\tau\,d\varphi$$

and the Laplacian is given by

$$\nabla^2 \Phi = \frac{1}{\sigma^{2} + \tau^{2}}
\left[
\frac{1}{\sigma} \frac{\partial}{\partial \sigma}
\left( \sigma \frac{\partial \Phi}{\partial \sigma} \right) +
\frac{1}{\tau} \frac{\partial}{\partial \tau}
\left( \tau \frac{\partial \Phi}{\partial \tau} \right)\right] +
\frac{1}{\sigma^2\tau^2}\frac{\partial^2 \Phi}{\partial \varphi^2}$$

Other differential operators such as $\nabla \cdot \mathbf{F}$ and $\nabla \times \mathbf{F}$ can be expressed in the coordinates $(\sigma, \tau, \phi)$ by substituting the scale factors into the general formulae found in orthogonal coordinates.

== See also ==
- Parabolic cylindrical coordinates
- Orthogonal coordinate system
- Curvilinear coordinates

== Bibliography ==
- Morse PM, Feshbach H (1953). Methods of Theoretical Physics, Part I. New York: McGraw-Hill. p. 660. ISBN 0-07-043316-X. LCCN 52011515.
- Margenau H, Murphy GM (1956). The Mathematics of Physics and Chemistry. New York: D. van Nostrand. pp. 185–186. LCCN 55010911.
- Korn GA, Korn TM (1961). Mathematical Handbook for Scientists and Engineers. New York: McGraw-Hill. p. 180. LCCN 59014456. ASIN B0000CKZX7.
- Sauer R, Szabó I (1967). Mathematische Hilfsmittel des Ingenieurs. New York: Springer Verlag. p. 96. LCCN 67025285.
- Zwillinger D (1992). Handbook of Integration. Boston, MA: Jones and Bartlett. p. 114. ISBN 0-86720-293-9. Same as Morse & Feshbach (1953), substituting u_{k} for ξ_{k}.
- Moon P, Spencer DE (1988). "Parabolic Coordinates (μ, ν, ψ)". Field Theory Handbook, Including Coordinate Systems, Differential Equations, and Their Solutions (corrected 2nd ed., 3rd print ed.). New York: Springer-Verlag. pp. 34–36 (Table 1.08). ISBN 978-0-387-18430-2.
