= Parabolic cylindrical coordinates =

Three-dimensional orthogonal coordinate system

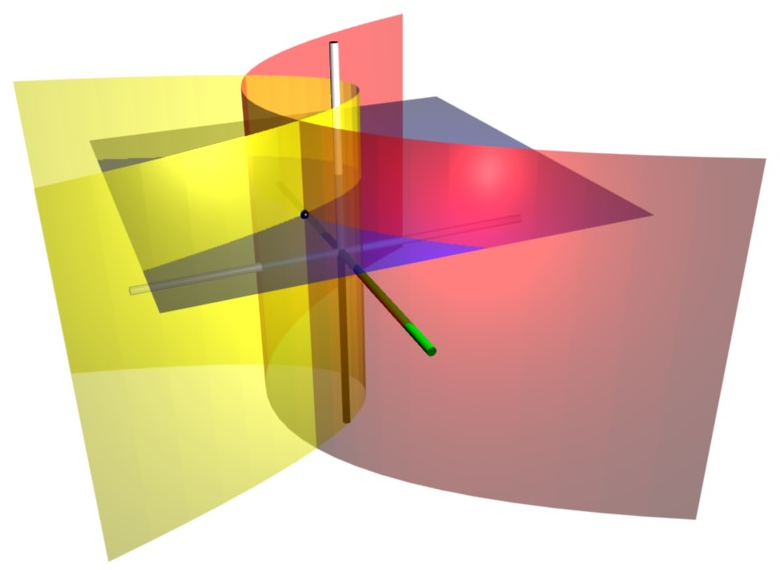
Coordinate surfaces of parabolic cylindrical coordinates. The red parabolic cylinder corresponds to σ=2, whereas the yellow parabolic cylinder corresponds to τ=1. The blue plane corresponds to z=2. These surfaces intersect at the point P (shown as a black sphere), which has Cartesian coordinates roughly (2, −1.5, 2).

In mathematics, parabolic cylindrical coordinates are a three-dimensional orthogonal coordinate system that results from projecting the two-dimensional parabolic coordinate system in the perpendicular $z$-direction. Hence, the coordinate surfaces are confocal parabolic cylinders. Parabolic cylindrical coordinates have found many applications, e.g., the potential theory of edges.

== Basic definition ==
Parabolic coordinate system showing curves of constant σ and τ the horizontal and vertical axes are the x and y coordinates respectively. These coordinates are projected along the z-axis, and so this diagram will hold for any value of the z coordinate.

The parabolic cylindrical coordinates (σ, τ, z) are defined in terms of the Cartesian coordinates (x, y, z) by:

$$\begin{align}
x &= \sigma \tau \\
y &= \frac{1}{2} \left( \tau^2 - \sigma^2 \right) \\
z &= z
\end{align}$$

The surfaces of constant σ form confocal parabolic cylinders

$$2 y = \frac{x^2}{\sigma^2} - \sigma^2$$

that open towards +y, whereas the surfaces of constant τ form confocal parabolic cylinders

$$2 y = -\frac{x^2}{\tau^2} + \tau^2$$

that open in the opposite direction, i.e., towards −y. The foci of all these parabolic cylinders are located along the line defined by x = y = 0. The radius r has a simple formula as well

$$r = \sqrt{x^2 + y^2} = \frac{1}{2} \left( \sigma^2 + \tau^2 \right)$$

that proves useful in solving the Hamilton–Jacobi equation in parabolic coordinates for the inverse-square central force problem of mechanics; for further details, see the Laplace–Runge–Lenz vector article.

== Scale factors ==
The scale factors for the parabolic cylindrical coordinates σ and τ are:

$$\begin{align}
h_\sigma &= h_\tau = \sqrt{\sigma^2 + \tau^2} \\
h_z &= 1
\end{align}$$

== Differential elements ==
The infinitesimal element of volume is

$$dV = h_\sigma h_\tau h_z d\sigma d\tau dz = ( \sigma^2 + \tau^2 ) d\sigma \, d\tau \, dz$$

The differential displacement is given by:

$$d\mathbf{l} = \sqrt{\sigma^2 + \tau^2} \, d\sigma \, \boldsymbol{\hat{\sigma}} + \sqrt{\sigma^2 + \tau^2} \, d\tau \, \boldsymbol{\hat{\tau}} + dz \, \mathbf{\hat{z}}$$

The differential normal area is given by:

$$d\mathbf{S} = \sqrt{\sigma^2 + \tau^2}       \, d\tau   \, dz  \boldsymbol{\hat{\sigma}} + \sqrt{\sigma^2 + \tau^2}       \, d\sigma \, dz    \boldsymbol{\hat{\tau}} + \left(\sigma^2 + \tau^2\right) \, d\sigma \, d\tau \mathbf{\hat{z}}$$

== Del ==
Let f be a scalar field. The gradient is given by

$$\nabla f = \frac{1}{\sqrt{\sigma^{2} + \tau^{2}}} {\partial f \over \partial \sigma}\boldsymbol{\hat{\sigma}} + \frac{1}{\sqrt{\sigma^{2} + \tau^{2}}} {\partial f \over \partial \tau}\boldsymbol{\hat{\tau}} + {\partial f \over \partial z}\mathbf{\hat{z}}$$

The Laplacian is given by

$$\nabla^2 f = \frac{1}{\sigma^{2} + \tau^{2}}
\left(\frac{\partial^{2} f}{\partial \sigma^{2}} +
\frac{\partial^{2} f}{\partial \tau^{2}} \right) +
\frac{\partial^{2} f}{\partial z^{2}}$$

Let A be a vector field of the form:

$$\mathbf A = A_\sigma \boldsymbol{\hat{\sigma}} + A_\tau \boldsymbol{\hat{\tau}} + A_z \mathbf{\hat{z}}$$

The divergence is given by

$$\nabla \cdot \mathbf A = \frac{1}{\sigma^{2} + \tau^{2}}\left({\partial (\sqrt{\sigma^2+\tau^2} A_\sigma) \over \partial \sigma} + {\partial (\sqrt{\sigma^2+\tau^2} A_\tau) \over \partial \tau}\right) + {\partial A_z \over \partial z}$$

The curl is given by

$$\nabla \times \mathbf A =
\left(
\frac{1}{\sqrt{\sigma^2 + \tau^2}} \frac{\partial A_z}{\partial \tau}
- \frac{\partial A_\tau}{\partial z}
\right) \boldsymbol{\hat{\sigma}}
- \left(
\frac{1}{\sqrt{\sigma^2 + \tau^2}} \frac{\partial A_z}{\partial \sigma}
- \frac{\partial A_\sigma}{\partial z}
\right) \boldsymbol{\hat{\tau}}
+ \frac{1}{\sigma^2 + \tau^2} \left(
\frac{\partial \left(\sqrt{\sigma^2 + \tau^2} A_\tau \right)}{\partial \sigma}
- \frac{\partial \left(\sqrt{\sigma^2 + \tau^2} A_\sigma\right)}{\partial \tau}
\right) \mathbf{\hat{z}}$$

Other differential operators can be expressed in the coordinates (σ, τ) by substituting the scale factors into the general formulae found in orthogonal coordinates.

== Relationship to other coordinate systems ==
Relationship to cylindrical coordinates (ρ, φ, z):

$$\begin{align}
\rho\cos\varphi &= \sigma \tau\\
\rho\sin\varphi &= \frac{1}{2} \left( \tau^2 - \sigma^2 \right) \\
z &= z \end{align}$$

Parabolic unit vectors expressed in terms of Cartesian unit vectors:

$$\begin{align}
\boldsymbol{\hat{\sigma}} &= \frac{\tau \hat{\mathbf x} - \sigma \hat{\mathbf y}}{\sqrt{\tau^2+\sigma^2}} \\
\boldsymbol{\hat{\tau}} &= \frac{\sigma \hat{\mathbf x} + \tau \hat{\mathbf y}}{\sqrt{\tau^2+\sigma^2}} \\
\mathbf{\hat{z}} &= \mathbf{\hat{z}}
\end{align}$$

== Parabolic cylinder harmonics ==
Since all of the surfaces of constant σ, τ and z are conicoids, Laplace's equation is separable in parabolic cylindrical coordinates. Using the technique of the separation of variables, a separated solution to Laplace's equation may be written:

$$V = S(\sigma) T(\tau) Z(z)$$

and Laplace's equation, divided by V, is written:

$$\frac{1}{\sigma^2 + \tau^2} \left[\frac{\ddot{S}}{S} + \frac{\ddot{T}}{T}\right] + \frac{\ddot{Z}}{Z} = 0$$

Since the Z equation is separate from the rest, we may write

$$\frac{\ddot{Z}}{Z}=-m^2$$

where m is constant. Z(z) has the solution:

$$Z_m(z)=A_1\,e^{imz}+A_2\,e^{-imz}$$

Substituting −m^{2} for $\ddot{Z} / Z$, Laplace's equation may now be written:

$$\left[\frac{\ddot{S}}{S} + \frac{\ddot{T}}{T}\right] = m^2 (\sigma^2 + \tau^2)$$

We may now separate the S and T functions and introduce another constant n^{2} to obtain:

$$\ddot{S} - (m^2\sigma^2 + n^2) S = 0$$
$$\ddot{T} - (m^2\tau^2 - n^2) T = 0$$

The solutions to these equations are the parabolic cylinder functions

$$S_{mn}(\sigma) = A_3 y_1(n^2 / 2m, \sigma \sqrt{2m}) + A_4 y_2(n^2 / 2m, \sigma \sqrt{2m})$$
$$T_{mn}(\tau)   = A_5 y_1(n^2 / 2m, i \tau \sqrt{2m}) + A_6 y_2(n^2 / 2m, i \tau \sqrt{2m})$$

The parabolic cylinder harmonics for (m, n) are now the product of the solutions. The combination will reduce the number of constants and the general solution to Laplace's equation may be written:

$$V(\sigma, \tau, z) = \sum_{m, n} A_{mn} S_{mn} T_{mn} Z_m$$

== Applications ==
The classic applications of parabolic cylindrical coordinates are in solving partial differential equations, e.g., Laplace's equation or the Helmholtz equation, for which such coordinates allow a separation of variables. A typical example would be the electric field surrounding a flat semi-infinite conducting plate.

== See also ==
- Parabolic coordinates
- Orthogonal coordinate system
- Curvilinear coordinates

== Bibliography ==
- Morse PM, Feshbach H (1953). Methods of Theoretical Physics, Part I. New York: McGraw-Hill. p. 658. ISBN 0-07-043316-X. LCCN 52011515.
- Margenau H, Murphy GM (1956). The Mathematics of Physics and Chemistry. New York: D. van Nostrand. pp. 186–187. LCCN 55010911.
- Korn GA, Korn TM (1961). Mathematical Handbook for Scientists and Engineers. New York: McGraw-Hill. p. 181. LCCN 59014456. ASIN B0000CKZX7.
- Sauer R, Szabó I (1967). Mathematische Hilfsmittel des Ingenieurs. New York: Springer Verlag. p. 96. LCCN 67025285.
- Zwillinger D (1992). Handbook of Integration. Boston, MA: Jones and Bartlett. p. 114. ISBN 0-86720-293-9. Same as Morse & Feshbach (1953), substituting u_{k} for ξ_{k}.
- Moon P, Spencer DE (1988). "Parabolic-Cylinder Coordinates (μ, ν, z)". Field Theory Handbook, Including Coordinate Systems, Differential Equations, and Their Solutions (corrected 2nd ed., 3rd print ed.). New York: Springer-Verlag. pp. 21–24 (Table 1.04). ISBN 978-0-387-18430-2.
