= Covariance and contravariance =

Covariance and contravariance may refer to:

- Covariance and contravariance of vectors, in mathematics and theoretical physics
- Covariance and contravariance of functors, in category theory
- Covariance and contravariance (computer science), whether a type system preserves the ordering ≤ of types
- An informal synonym for invariance (physics)

== See also ==
- Covariance, in probability theory and statistics, the measure of how much two random variables vary together
- Covariance (disambiguation)
