= Curvilinear coordinates =

Coordinate system whose directions vary in space

Curvilinear (top), affine (right), and Cartesian (left) coordinates in two-dimensional space

In geometry, curvilinear coordinates are a coordinate system for Euclidean space in which the coordinate lines may be curved. These coordinates may be derived from a set of Cartesian coordinates by using a transformation that is locally invertible (a one-to-one map) at each point. This means that one can convert a point given in a Cartesian coordinate system to its curvilinear coordinates and back. The name curvilinear coordinates, coined by the French mathematician Lamé, derives from the fact that the coordinate surfaces of the curvilinear systems may have non-zero curvature.

Well-known examples of curvilinear coordinate systems in three-dimensional Euclidean space (R^{3}) are cylindrical and spherical coordinates. A Cartesian coordinate surface in this space is a coordinate plane; for example z = 0 defines the x-y plane. In the same space, the coordinate surface r = 1 in spherical coordinates is the surface of a unit sphere, which is curved. The formalism of curvilinear coordinates provides a unified and general description of the standard coordinate systems.

Curvilinear coordinates are often used to define the location or distribution of physical quantities which may be, for example, scalars, vectors, or tensors. Mathematical expressions involving these quantities in vector calculus and tensor analysis (such as the gradient, divergence, curl, and Laplacian) can be transformed from one coordinate system to another, according to transformation rules for scalars, vectors, and tensors. Such expressions then become valid for any curvilinear coordinate system.

A curvilinear coordinate system may be simpler to use than the Cartesian coordinate system for some applications. The motion of particles under the influence of central forces is usually easier to solve in spherical coordinates than in Cartesian coordinates; this is true of many physical problems with spherical symmetry defined in R^{3}. Equations with boundary conditions that follow coordinate surfaces for a particular curvilinear coordinate system may be easier to solve in that system. While one might describe the motion of a particle in a rectangular box using Cartesian coordinates, it is easier to describe the motion in a sphere with spherical coordinates. Spherical coordinates are the most common curvilinear coordinate systems and are used in Earth sciences, cartography, quantum mechanics, relativity, and engineering.

== Orthogonal curvilinear coordinates in three dimensions ==
=== Coordinates, basis, and vectors ===
Fig. 1 - Coordinate surfaces, coordinate lines, and coordinate axes of general curvilinear coordinates.

Fig. 2 - Coordinate surfaces, coordinate lines, and coordinate axes of spherical coordinates. Surfaces: r - spheres, θ - cones, Φ - half-planes; Lines: r - straight beams, θ - vertical semicircles, Φ - horizontal circles; Axes: r - straight beams, θ - tangents to vertical semicircles, Φ - tangents to horizontal circles

For now, consider 3D space. A point P in 3D space (or its position vector r) can be defined using Cartesian coordinates (x, y, z) [equivalently written (x^{1}, x^{2}, x^{3})], by $\mathbf{r} = x \mathbf{e}_x + y\mathbf{e}_y + z\mathbf{e}_z$, where e_{x}, e_{y}, e_{z} are the standard basis vectors.

It can also be defined by its curvilinear coordinates (q^{1}, q^{2}, q^{3}) if this coordinate tuple (a triplet of numbers) defines a single point in an unambiguous way. The relation between the coordinates is then given by the invertible transformation functions:

$$x = f^1(q^1, q^2, q^3),\, y = f^2(q^1, q^2, q^3),\, z = f^3(q^1, q^2, q^3)$$
$$q^1 = g^1(x,y,z),\, q^2 = g^2(x,y,z),\, q^3 = g^3(x,y,z)$$

The surfaces q^{1} = constant, q^{2} = constant, q^{3} = constant are called the coordinate surfaces; and the space curves formed by their intersection in pairs are called the coordinate curves. The coordinate axes are determined by the tangents to the coordinate curves at the intersection of three surfaces. They are not in general fixed directions in space, which happens to be the case for simple Cartesian coordinates, and thus there is generally no natural global basis for curvilinear coordinates.

In the Cartesian system, the standard basis vectors can be derived from the derivative of the location of point P with respect to the local coordinate

$$\mathbf{e}_x = \dfrac{\partial\mathbf{r}}{\partial x}; \;
\mathbf{e}_y = \dfrac{\partial\mathbf{r}}{\partial y}; \;
\mathbf{e}_z = \dfrac{\partial\mathbf{r}}{\partial z}.$$

Applying the same derivatives to the curvilinear system locally at point P defines the natural basis vectors:

$$\mathbf{h}_1 = \dfrac{\partial\mathbf{r}}{\partial q^1}; \;
\mathbf{h}_2 = \dfrac{\partial\mathbf{r}}{\partial q^2}; \;
\mathbf{h}_3 = \dfrac{\partial\mathbf{r}}{\partial q^3}.$$

Such a basis, whose vectors change their direction and/or magnitude from point to point is called a local basis. All bases associated with curvilinear coordinates are necessarily local. Basis vectors that are the same at all points are global bases, and can be associated only with linear or affine coordinate systems.

For this article e is reserved for the standard basis (Cartesian) and h or b is for the curvilinear basis.

These may not have unit length, and may also not be orthogonal. In the case that they are orthogonal at all points where the derivatives are well-defined, we define the Lamé coefficients (after Gabriel Lamé) by

$$h_1 = |\mathbf{h}_1|; \; h_2 = |\mathbf{h}_2|; \; h_3 = |\mathbf{h}_3|$$

and the curvilinear orthonormal basis vectors by

$$\mathbf{b}_1 = \dfrac{\mathbf{h}_1}{h_1}; \;
\mathbf{b}_2 = \dfrac{\mathbf{h}_2}{h_2}; \;
\mathbf{b}_3 = \dfrac{\mathbf{h}_3}{h_3}.$$

These basis vectors may well depend upon the position of P; it is therefore necessary that they are not assumed to be constant over a region. (They technically form a basis for the tangent space of $\mathbb{R}^3$ at P, and so are local to P.)

In general, curvilinear coordinates allow the natural basis vectors h_{i} not all mutually perpendicular to each other, and not required to be of unit length: they can be of arbitrary magnitude and direction. The use of an orthogonal basis makes vector manipulations simpler than for non-orthogonal. However, some areas of physics and engineering, particularly fluid mechanics and continuum mechanics, require non-orthogonal bases to describe deformations and fluid transport to account for complicated directional dependences of physical quantities. A discussion of the general case appears later on this page.

== Vector calculus ==
=== Differential elements ===
In orthogonal curvilinear coordinates, since the total differential change in r is

$$d\mathbf{r}=\dfrac{\partial\mathbf{r}}{\partial q^1}dq^1 + \dfrac{\partial\mathbf{r}}{\partial q^2}dq^2 + \dfrac{\partial\mathbf{r}}{\partial q^3}dq^3 = h_1 dq^1 \mathbf{b}_1 + h_2 dq^2 \mathbf{b}_2 + h_3 dq^3 \mathbf{b}_3$$

so scale factors are $h_i = \left|\frac{\partial\mathbf{r}}{\partial q^i}\right|$

In non-orthogonal coordinates the length of $d\mathbf{r}= dq^1 \mathbf{h}_1 + dq^2 \mathbf{h}_2 + dq^3 \mathbf{h}_3$ is the positive square root of $d\mathbf{r} \cdot d\mathbf{r} = dq^i dq^j \mathbf{h}_i \cdot \mathbf{h}_j$ (with Einstein summation convention). The six independent scalar products g_{ij}=h_{i}.h_{j} of the natural basis vectors generalize the three scale factors defined above for orthogonal coordinates. The nine g_{ij} are the components of the metric tensor, which has only three non zero components in orthogonal coordinates: g_{11}=h_{1}h_{1}, g_{22}=h_{2}h_{2}, g_{33}=h_{3}h_{3}.

== Covariant and contravariant bases ==
A vector v (red) represented by • a vector basis (yellow, left: e_{1}, e_{2}, e_{3}), tangent vectors to coordinate curves (black) and • a covector basis or cobasis (blue, right: e^{1}, e^{2}, e^{3}), normal vectors to coordinate surfaces (grey) in general (not necessarily orthogonal) curvilinear coordinates (q^{1}, q^{2}, q^{3}). The basis and cobasis do not coincide unless the coordinate system is orthogonal.

Spatial gradients, distances, time derivatives and scale factors are interrelated within a coordinate system by two groups of basis vectors:

1. basis vectors that are locally tangent to their associated coordinate pathline:
  $$\mathbf{b}_i=\dfrac{\partial\mathbf{r}}{\partial q^i}$$
  are contravariant vectors (denoted by lowered indices), and
2. basis vectors that are locally normal to the isosurface created by the other coordinates:
  $$\mathbf{b}^i=\nabla q^i$$
  are covariant vectors (denoted by raised indices), ∇ is the del operator.

Note that, because of Einstein's summation convention, the position of the indices of the vectors is the opposite of that of the coordinates.

Consequently, a general curvilinear coordinate system has two sets of basis vectors for every point: {b_{1}, b_{2}, b_{3}} is the contravariant basis, and {b^{1}, b^{2}, b^{3}} is the covariant (a.k.a. reciprocal) basis. The covariant and contravariant basis vectors types have identical direction for orthogonal curvilinear coordinate systems, but as usual have inverted units with respect to each other.

Note the following important equality:
$$\mathbf{b}^i\cdot\mathbf{b}_j = \delta^i_j$$
wherein $\delta^i_j$ denotes the generalized Kronecker delta.

Proof

In the Cartesian coordinate system $( \mathbf{e}_x , \mathbf{e}_y, \mathbf{e}_z )$, we can write the dot product as:

$$\mathbf{b}_i\cdot\mathbf{b}^j = \left( \dfrac {\partial x} {\partial q_i} , \dfrac {\partial y} {\partial q_i} , \dfrac {\partial z} {\partial q_i} \right) \cdot \left( \dfrac {\partial q_j} {\partial x} , \dfrac {\partial q_j} {\partial y} , \dfrac {\partial q_j} {\partial z} \right) = \dfrac {\partial x} {\partial q_i} \dfrac {\partial q_j} {\partial x} + \dfrac {\partial y} {\partial q_i} \dfrac {\partial q_j} {\partial y} + \dfrac {\partial z} {\partial q_i} \dfrac {\partial q_j} {\partial z}$$

Consider an infinitesimal displacement $d \mathbf{r} = dx \cdot \mathbf{e}_x + dy \cdot \mathbf{e}_y + dz \cdot \mathbf{e}_z$. Let dq_{1}, dq_{2} and dq_{3} denote the corresponding infinitesimal changes in curvilinear coordinates q_{1}, q_{2} and q_{3} respectively.

By the chain rule, dq_{1} can be expressed as:

$$dq_1 = \dfrac {\partial q_1} {\partial x} dx + \dfrac {\partial q_1} {\partial y} dy + \dfrac {\partial q_1} {\partial z} dz
= \dfrac {\partial q_1} {\partial x} dx + \dfrac {\partial q_1} {\partial y} \left(\dfrac {\partial y} {\partial q_1} dq_1 + \dfrac {\partial y} {\partial q_2} dq_2 + \dfrac {\partial y} {\partial q_3} dq_3\right) + \dfrac {\partial q_1} {\partial z} \left(\dfrac {\partial z} {\partial q_1} dq_1 + \dfrac {\partial z} {\partial q_2} dq_2 + \dfrac {\partial z} {\partial q_3} dq_3\right)$$

If the displacement dr is such that dq_{2} = dq_{3} = 0, i.e. the position vector r moves by an infinitesimal amount along the coordinate axis q_{2}=const and q_{3}=const, then:

$$dq_1 = \dfrac {\partial q_1} {\partial x} dx + \dfrac {\partial q_1} {\partial y} \dfrac {\partial y} {\partial q_1} dq_1 + \dfrac {\partial q_1} {\partial z} \dfrac {\partial z} {\partial q_1} dq_1$$

Dividing by dq_{1}, and taking the limit dq_{1} → 0:

$$1 =  \dfrac {\partial q_1} {\partial x} \dfrac {\partial x} {\partial q_1}   + \dfrac {\partial q_1} {\partial y} \dfrac {\partial y} {\partial q_1} + \dfrac {\partial q_1} {\partial z} \dfrac {\partial z} {\partial q_1} = \dfrac {\partial x} {\partial q_1} \dfrac {\partial q_1} {\partial x} + \dfrac {\partial y} {\partial q_1} \dfrac {\partial q_1} {\partial y} + \dfrac {\partial z} {\partial q_1} \dfrac {\partial q_1} {\partial z}$$

or equivalently:

$$\mathbf{b}_1\cdot\mathbf{b}^1 = 1$$

Now if the displacement dr is such that dq_{1}=dq_{3}=0, i.e. the position vector r moves by an infinitesimal amount along the coordinate axis q_{1}=const and q_{3}=const, then:

$$0 = \dfrac {\partial q_1} {\partial x} dx + \dfrac {\partial q_1} {\partial y} \dfrac {\partial y} {\partial q_2} dq_2 + \dfrac {\partial q_1} {\partial z} \dfrac {\partial z} {\partial q_2} dq_2$$

Dividing by dq_{2}, and taking the limit dq_{2} → 0:

$$0 = \dfrac {\partial q_1} {\partial x} \dfrac {\partial x} {\partial q_2}  + \dfrac {\partial q_1} {\partial y} \dfrac {\partial y} {\partial q_2} + \dfrac {\partial q_1} {\partial z} \dfrac {\partial z} {\partial q_2}  = \dfrac {\partial x} {\partial q_2} \dfrac {\partial q_1} {\partial x} + \dfrac {\partial y} {\partial q_2} \dfrac {\partial q_1} {\partial y}  + \dfrac {\partial z} {\partial q_2} \dfrac {\partial q_1} {\partial z}$$

or equivalently:

$$\mathbf{b}_2 \cdot \mathbf{b}^1 = 0$$

And so forth for the other dot products.

Alternative Proof:

$$\delta^i_j dq^j=dq^i=\nabla q^i \cdot d\mathbf{r}=\mathbf{b}^i \cdot \dfrac{\partial\mathbf{r}}{\partial q^j} dq^j = \mathbf{b}^i \cdot \mathbf{b}_j dq^j$$

and the Einstein summation convention is implied.

A vector v can be specified in terms of either basis, i.e.,

$$\mathbf{v} = v^1\mathbf{b}_1 + v^2\mathbf{b}_2 + v^3\mathbf{b}_3 = v_1\mathbf{b}^1 + v_2\mathbf{b}^2 + v_3\mathbf{b}^3$$

Using the Einstein summation convention, the basis vectors relate to the components by

$$\mathbf{v}\cdot\mathbf{b}^i = v^k\mathbf{b}_k\cdot\mathbf{b}^i = v^k\delta^i_k = v^i$$
$$\mathbf{v}\cdot\mathbf{b}_i = v_k\mathbf{b}^k\cdot\mathbf{b}_i = v_k\delta_i^k = v_i$$

and

$$\mathbf{v}\cdot\mathbf{b}_i = v^k\mathbf{b}_k\cdot\mathbf{b}_i = g_{ki}v^k$$
$$\mathbf{v}\cdot\mathbf{b}^i = v_k\mathbf{b}^k\cdot\mathbf{b}^i = g^{ki}v_k$$

where g is the metric tensor (see below).

A vector can be specified with covariant coordinates (lowered indices, written v_{k}) or contravariant coordinates (raised indices, written v^{k}). From the above vector sums, it can be seen that contravariant coordinates are associated with covariant basis vectors, and covariant coordinates are associated with contravariant basis vectors.

A key feature of the representation of vectors and tensors in terms of indexed components and basis vectors is invariance in the sense that vector components which transform in a covariant manner (or contravariant manner) are paired with basis vectors that transform in a contravariant manner (or covariant manner).

== Integration ==
=== Constructing a covariant basis in one dimension ===
Fig. 3 – Transformation of local covariant basis in the case of general curvilinear coordinates

Consider the one-dimensional curve shown in Fig. 3. At point P, taken as an origin, x is one of the Cartesian coordinates, and q^{1} is one of the curvilinear coordinates. The local (non-unit) basis vector is b_{1} (notated h_{1} above, with b reserved for unit vectors) and it is built on the q^{1} axis which is a tangent to that coordinate line at the point P. The axis q^{1} and thus the vector b_{1} form an angle $\alpha$ with the Cartesian x axis and the Cartesian basis vector e_{1}.

It can be seen from triangle PAB that

$$\cos \alpha = \cfrac{|\mathbf{e}_1|}{|\mathbf{b}_1|} \quad \Rightarrow \quad |\mathbf{e}_1| = |\mathbf{b}_1|\cos \alpha$$

where |e_{1}|, |b_{1}| are the magnitudes of the two basis vectors, i.e., the scalar intercepts PB and PA. PA is also the projection of b_{1} on the x axis.

However, this method for basis vector transformations using directional cosines is inapplicable to curvilinear coordinates for the following reasons:

1. By increasing the distance from P, the angle between the curved line q^{1} and Cartesian axis x increasingly deviates from $\alpha$.
2. At the distance PB the true angle is that which the tangent at point C forms with the x axis and the latter angle is clearly different from $\alpha$.

The angles that the q^{1} line and that axis form with the x axis become closer in value the closer one moves towards point P and become exactly equal at P.

Let point E be located very close to P, so close that the distance PE is infinitesimally small. Then PE measured on the q^{1} axis almost coincides with PE measured on the q^{1} line. At the same time, the ratio PD/PE (PD being the projection of PE on the x axis) becomes almost exactly equal to $\cos\alpha$.

Let the infinitesimally small intercepts PD and PE be labelled, respectively, as dx and dq^{1}. Then

$$\cos \alpha = \cfrac{dx}{dq^1} = \frac{|\mathbf{e}_1|}{|\mathbf{b}_1|}$$.

Thus, the directional cosines can be substituted in transformations with the more exact ratios between infinitesimally small coordinate intercepts. It follows that the component (projection) of b_{1} on the x axis is

$$p^1 = \mathbf{b}_1\cdot\cfrac{\mathbf{e}_1}{|\mathbf{e}_1|} = |\mathbf{b}_1|\cfrac{|\mathbf{e}_1|}{|\mathbf{e}_1|}\cos\alpha = |\mathbf{b}_1|\cfrac{dx}{dq^1} \quad \Rightarrow \quad \cfrac{p^1}{|\mathbf{b}_1|} = \cfrac{dx}{dq^1}$$.

If q^{i} = q^{i}(x_{1}, x_{2}, x_{3}) and x_{i} = x_{i}(q^{1}, q^{2}, q^{3}) are smooth (continuously differentiable) functions the transformation ratios can be written as $\cfrac{\partial q^i}{\partial x_j}$ and $\cfrac{\partial x_i}{\partial q^j}$. That is, those ratios are partial derivatives of coordinates belonging to one system with respect to coordinates belonging to the other system.

=== Constructing a covariant basis in three dimensions ===
Doing the same for the coordinates in the other 2 dimensions, b_{1} can be expressed as:

$$\mathbf{b}_1 = p^1\mathbf{e}_1 + p^2\mathbf{e}_2 + p^3\mathbf{e}_3 = \cfrac{\partial x_1}{\partial q^1} \mathbf{e}_1 + \cfrac{\partial x_2}{\partial q^1} \mathbf{e}_2 + \cfrac{\partial x_3}{\partial q^1} \mathbf{e}_3$$

Similar equations hold for b_{2} and b_{3} so that the standard basis {e_{1}, e_{2}, e_{3}} is transformed to a local (ordered and normalised) basis {b_{1}, b_{2}, b_{3}} by the following system of equations:

$$\begin{align}
\mathbf{b}_1 & = \cfrac{\partial x_1}{\partial q^1} \mathbf{e}_1 + \cfrac{\partial x_2}{\partial q^1} \mathbf{e}_2 + \cfrac{\partial x_3}{\partial q^1} \mathbf{e}_3 \\
\mathbf{b}_2 & = \cfrac{\partial x_1}{\partial q^2} \mathbf{e}_1 + \cfrac{\partial x_2}{\partial q^2} \mathbf{e}_2 + \cfrac{\partial x_3}{\partial q^2} \mathbf{e}_3 \\
\mathbf{b}_3 & = \cfrac{\partial x_1}{\partial q^3} \mathbf{e}_1 + \cfrac{\partial x_2}{\partial q^3} \mathbf{e}_2 + \cfrac{\partial x_3}{\partial q^3} \mathbf{e}_3
\end{align}$$

By analogous reasoning, one can obtain the inverse transformation from local basis to standard basis:

$$\begin{align}
\mathbf{e}_1 & = \cfrac{\partial q^1}{\partial x_1} \mathbf{b}_1 + \cfrac{\partial q^2}{\partial x_1} \mathbf{b}_2 + \cfrac{\partial q^3}{\partial x_1} \mathbf{b}_3 \\
\mathbf{e}_2 & = \cfrac{\partial q^1}{\partial x_2} \mathbf{b}_1 + \cfrac{\partial q^2}{\partial x_2} \mathbf{b}_2 + \cfrac{\partial q^3}{\partial x_2} \mathbf{b}_3 \\
\mathbf{e}_3 & = \cfrac{\partial q^1}{\partial x_3} \mathbf{b}_1 + \cfrac{\partial q^2}{\partial x_3} \mathbf{b}_2 + \cfrac{\partial q^3}{\partial x_3} \mathbf{b}_3
\end{align}$$

=== Jacobian of the transformation ===
The above systems of linear equations can be written in matrix form using the Einstein summation convention as

$$\cfrac{\partial x_i}{\partial q^k} \mathbf{e}_i = \mathbf{b}_k, \quad \cfrac{\partial q^i}{\partial x_k} \mathbf{b}_i = \mathbf{e}_k$$.

This coefficient matrix of the linear system is the Jacobian matrix (and its inverse) of the transformation. These are the equations that can be used to transform a Cartesian basis into a curvilinear basis, and vice versa.

In three dimensions, the expanded forms of these matrices are

$$\mathbf{J} = \begin{bmatrix}
\cfrac{\partial x_1}{\partial q^1} & \cfrac{\partial x_1}{\partial q^2} & \cfrac{\partial x_1}{\partial q^3} \\
\cfrac{\partial x_2}{\partial q^1} & \cfrac{\partial x_2}{\partial q^2} & \cfrac{\partial x_2}{\partial q^3} \\
\cfrac{\partial x_3}{\partial q^1} & \cfrac{\partial x_3}{\partial q^2} & \cfrac{\partial x_3}{\partial q^3} \\
\end{bmatrix},\quad
\mathbf{J}^{-1} = \begin{bmatrix}
\cfrac{\partial q^1}{\partial x_1} & \cfrac{\partial q^1}{\partial x_2} & \cfrac{\partial q^1}{\partial x_3} \\
\cfrac{\partial q^2}{\partial x_1} & \cfrac{\partial q^2}{\partial x_2} & \cfrac{\partial q^2}{\partial x_3} \\
\cfrac{\partial q^3}{\partial x_1} & \cfrac{\partial q^3}{\partial x_2} & \cfrac{\partial q^3}{\partial x_3} \\
\end{bmatrix}$$

In the inverse transformation (second equation system), the unknowns are the curvilinear basis vectors. For any specific location there can only exist one and only one set of basis vectors (else the basis is not well defined at that point). This condition is satisfied if and only if the equation system has a single solution. In linear algebra, a linear equation system has a single solution (non-trivial) only if the determinant of its system matrix is non-zero:

$$\det(\mathbf{J}^{-1})  \neq 0$$

which shows the rationale behind the above requirement concerning the inverse Jacobian determinant.

== Generalization to n dimensions ==
The formalism extends to any finite dimension as follows.

Consider the real Euclidean n-dimensional space, that is R^{n} = R × R × ... × R (n times) where R is the set of real numbers and × denotes the Cartesian product, which is a vector space.

The coordinates of this space can be denoted by: x = (x_{1}, x_{2},...,x_{n}). Since this is a vector (an element of the vector space), it can be written as:

$$\mathbf{x} = \sum_{i=1}^n x_i\mathbf{e}^i$$

where e^{1} = (1,0,0...,0), e^{2} = (0,1,0...,0), e^{3} = (0,0,1...,0),...,e^{n} = (0,0,0...,1) is the standard basis set of vectors for the space R^{n}, and i = 1, 2,...n is an index labelling components. Each vector has exactly one component in each dimension (or "axis") and they are mutually orthogonal (perpendicular) and normalized (has unit magnitude).

More generally, we can define basis vectors b_{i} so that they depend on q = (q_{1}, q_{2},...,q_{n}), i.e. they change from point to point: b_{i} = b_{i}(q). In which case to define the same point x in terms of this alternative basis: the coordinates with respect to this basis v_{i} also necessarily depend on x also, that is v_{i} = v_{i}(x). Then a vector v in this space, with respect to these alternative coordinates and basis vectors, can be expanded as a linear combination in this basis (which simply means to multiply each basis vector e_{i} by a number v_{i} – scalar multiplication):

$$\mathbf{v} = \sum_{j=1}^n \bar{v}^j\mathbf{b}_j = \sum_{j=1}^n \bar{v}^j(\mathbf{q})\mathbf{b}_j(\mathbf{q})$$

The vector sum that describes v in the new basis is composed of different vectors, although the sum itself remains the same.

== Transformation of coordinates ==
From a more general and abstract perspective, a curvilinear coordinate system is simply a coordinate patch on the differentiable manifold E^{n} (n-dimensional Euclidean space) that is diffeomorphic to the Cartesian coordinate patch on the manifold. Two diffeomorphic coordinate patches on a differential manifold need not overlap differentiably. With this simple definition of a curvilinear coordinate system, all the results that follow below are simply applications of standard theorems in differential topology.

The transformation functions are such that there's a one-to-one relationship between points in the "old" and "new" coordinates, that is, those functions are bijections, and fulfil the following requirements within their domains:

1. They are smooth functions: q^{i} = q^{i}(x)
2. The inverse Jacobian determinant
  $$J^{-1}=\begin{vmatrix}
\dfrac{\partial q^1}{\partial x_1} & \dfrac{\partial q^1}{\partial x_2} & \cdots & \dfrac{\partial q^1}{\partial x_n} \\
\dfrac{\partial q^2}{\partial x_1} & \dfrac{\partial q^2}{\partial x_2} & \cdots & \dfrac{\partial q^2}{\partial x_n} \\
\vdots & \vdots & \ddots & \vdots \\
\dfrac{\partial q^n}{\partial x_1} & \dfrac{\partial q^n}{\partial x_2} & \cdots & \dfrac{\partial q^n}{\partial x_n}
\end{vmatrix} \neq 0$$
  is not zero; meaning the transformation is invertible: x_{i}(q) according to the inverse function theorem. The condition that the Jacobian determinant is not zero reflects the fact that three surfaces from different families intersect in one and only one point and thus determine the position of this point in a unique way.

== Vector and tensor algebra in three-dimensional curvilinear coordinates ==
Elementary vector and tensor algebra in curvilinear coordinates is used in some of the older scientific literature in mechanics and physics and can be indispensable to understanding work from the early and mid-1900s, for example the text by Green and Zerna. Some useful relations in the algebra of vectors and second-order tensors in curvilinear coordinates are given in this section. The notation and contents are primarily from Ogden, Naghdi, Simmonds, Green and Zerna, Basar and Weichert, and Ciarlet.

== Tensors in curvilinear coordinates ==
A second-order tensor can be expressed as

$$\boldsymbol{S} = S^{ij}\mathbf{b}_i\otimes\mathbf{b}_j = S^i{}_j\mathbf{b}_i\otimes\mathbf{b}^j = S_i{}^j\mathbf{b}^i\otimes\mathbf{b}_j = S_{ij}\mathbf{b}^i\otimes\mathbf{b}^j$$

where $\scriptstyle\otimes$ denotes the tensor product. The components S^{ij} are called the contravariant components, S^{i} _{j} the mixed right-covariant components, S_{i} ^{j} the mixed left-covariant components, and S_{ij} the covariant components of the second-order tensor. The components of the second-order tensor are related by

$$S^{ij} = g^{ik}S_k{}^j = g^{jk}S^i{}_k = g^{ik}g^{j\ell}S_{k\ell}$$

=== The metric tensor in orthogonal curvilinear coordinates ===
At each point, one can construct a small line element dx, so the square of the length of the line element is the scalar product dx • dx and is called the metric of the space, given by:

$$d\mathbf{x}\cdot d\mathbf{x} = \cfrac{\partial x_i}{\partial q^j}\cfrac{\partial x_i}{\partial q^k}dq^jdq^k$$.

The following portion of the above equation

$$\cfrac{\partial x_k}{\partial q^i}\cfrac{\partial x_k}{\partial q^j} = g_{ij}(q^i,q^j) = \mathbf{b}_i\cdot\mathbf{b}_j$$

is a symmetric tensor called the fundamental (or metric) tensor of the Euclidean space in curvilinear coordinates.

Indices can be raised and lowered by the metric:

$$v^i = g^{ik}v_k$$

==== Relation to Lamé coefficients ====
Defining the scale factors h_{i} by

$$h_ih_j = g_{ij} = \mathbf{b}_i\cdot\mathbf{b}_j \quad \Rightarrow \quad h_i =\sqrt{g_{ii}}= \left|\mathbf{b}_i\right|=\left|\cfrac{\partial\mathbf{x}}{\partial q^i}\right|$$

gives a relation between the metric tensor and the Lamé coefficients, and

$$g_{ij} = \cfrac{\partial\mathbf{x}}{\partial q^i}\cdot\cfrac{\partial\mathbf{x}}{\partial q^j}
= \left( h_{ki}\mathbf{e}_k\right)\cdot\left( h_{mj}\mathbf{e}_m\right)
= h_{ki}h_{kj}$$

where h_{ij} are the Lamé coefficients. For an orthogonal basis we also have:

$$g = g_{11}g_{22}g_{33} = h_1^2h_2^2h_3^2 \quad \Rightarrow \quad \sqrt{g} = h_1h_2h_3 = J$$

==== Example: Polar coordinates ====
If we consider polar coordinates for R^{2},

$$(x, y)=(r \cos \theta, r \sin \theta)$$

(r, θ) are the curvilinear coordinates, and the Jacobian determinant of the transformation (r,θ) → (r cos θ, r sin θ) is r.

The orthogonal basis vectors are b_{r} = (cos θ, sin θ), b_{θ} = (−r sin θ, r cos θ). The scale factors are h_{r} = 1 and h_{θ}= r. The fundamental tensor is g_{11} =1, g_{22} =r^{2}, g_{12} = g_{21} =0.

=== The alternating tensor ===
In an orthonormal right-handed basis, the third-order alternating tensor is defined as

$$\boldsymbol{\mathcal{E}} = \varepsilon_{ijk}\mathbf{e}^i\otimes\mathbf{e}^j\otimes\mathbf{e}^k$$

In a general curvilinear basis the same tensor may be expressed as

$$\boldsymbol{\mathcal{E}} = \mathcal{E}_{ijk}\mathbf{b}^i\otimes\mathbf{b}^j\otimes\mathbf{b}^k
= \mathcal{E}^{ijk}\mathbf{b}_i\otimes\mathbf{b}_j\otimes\mathbf{b}_k$$

It can also be shown that

$$\mathcal{E}^{ijk} = \cfrac{1}{J}\varepsilon_{ijk} = \cfrac{1}{+\sqrt{g}}\varepsilon_{ijk}$$

=== Christoffel symbols ===
Christoffel symbols of the first kind $\Gamma_{kij}$

$$\mathbf{b}_{i,j} = \frac{\partial \mathbf{b}_i}{\partial q^j} = \mathbf{b}^k \Gamma_{kij} \quad \Rightarrow \quad
\mathbf{b}_k  \cdot \mathbf{b}_{i,j}  = \Gamma_{kij}$$

where the comma denotes a partial derivative (see Ricci calculus). To express Γ_{kij} in terms of g_{ij},

$$\begin{align}
g_{ij,k} & = (\mathbf{b}_i\cdot\mathbf{b}_j)_{,k} = \mathbf{b}_{i,k}\cdot\mathbf{b}_j + \mathbf{b}_i\cdot\mathbf{b}_{j,k}
= \Gamma_{jik} + \Gamma_{ijk}\\
g_{ik,j} & = (\mathbf{b}_i\cdot\mathbf{b}_k)_{,j} = \mathbf{b}_{i,j}\cdot\mathbf{b}_k + \mathbf{b}_i\cdot\mathbf{b}_{k,j}
= \Gamma_{kij} + \Gamma_{ikj}\\
g_{jk,i} & = (\mathbf{b}_j\cdot\mathbf{b}_k)_{,i} = \mathbf{b}_{j,i}\cdot\mathbf{b}_k + \mathbf{b}_j\cdot\mathbf{b}_{k,i}
= \Gamma_{kji} + \Gamma_{jki}
\end{align}$$

Since

$$\mathbf{b}_{i,j} = \mathbf{b}_{j,i}\quad\Rightarrow\quad\Gamma_{kij} = \Gamma_{kji}$$

using these to rearrange the above relations gives

$$\Gamma_{kij} = \frac{1}{2}(g_{ik,j} + g_{jk,i} - g_{ij,k}) = \frac{1}{2}[(\mathbf{b}_i\cdot\mathbf{b}_k)_{,j} + (\mathbf{b}_j\cdot\mathbf{b}_k)_{,i} - (\mathbf{b}_i\cdot\mathbf{b}_j)_{,k}]$$

Christoffel symbols of the second kind $\Gamma^k{}_{ji}$

$$\Gamma^k{}_{ij} = g^{kl}\Gamma_{lij} = \Gamma^k{}_{ji},\quad \cfrac{\partial \mathbf{b}_i}{\partial q^j} = \mathbf{b}_k \Gamma^k{}_{ij}$$

This implies that

$\Gamma^k{}_{ij} = \cfrac{\partial \mathbf{b}_i}{\partial q^j}\cdot\mathbf{b}^k = -\mathbf{b}_i\cdot\cfrac{\partial \mathbf{b}^k}{\partial q^j}\quad$ since $\quad\cfrac{\partial}{\partial q^j}(\mathbf{b}_i\cdot\mathbf{b}^k)=0$.

Other relations that follow are

$$\cfrac{\partial \mathbf{b}^i}{\partial q^j} = -\Gamma^i{}_{jk}\mathbf{b}^k,\quad
\boldsymbol{\nabla}\mathbf{b}_i = \Gamma^k{}_{ij}\mathbf{b}_k\otimes\mathbf{b}^j,\quad
\boldsymbol{\nabla}\mathbf{b}^i = -\Gamma^i{}_{jk}\mathbf{b}^k\otimes\mathbf{b}^j$$

=== Vector operations ===
1. Dot product: The scalar product of two vectors in curvilinear coordinates is
  $$\mathbf{u}\cdot\mathbf{v} = u^iv_i = u_iv^i = g_{ij}u^iv^j = g^{ij}u_iv_j$$
2. Cross product: The cross product of two vectors is given by
  $$\mathbf{u}\times\mathbf{v} = \epsilon_{ijk}{u}_j{v}_k\mathbf{e}_i$$
  where $\epsilon_{ijk}$ is the permutation symbol and $\mathbf{e}_i$ is a Cartesian basis vector. In curvilinear coordinates, the equivalent expression is
  $$\mathbf{u}\times\mathbf{v} = [(\mathbf{b}_m\times\mathbf{b}_n)\cdot\mathbf{b}_s]u^mv^n\mathbf{b}^s
= \mathcal{E}_{smn}u^mv^n\mathbf{b}^s$$
  where $\mathcal{E}_{ijk}$ is the third-order alternating tensor.

== Vector and tensor calculus in three-dimensional curvilinear coordinates ==
Adjustments need to be made in the calculation of line, surface and volume integrals. For simplicity, the following restricts to three dimensions and orthogonal curvilinear coordinates. However, the same arguments apply for n-dimensional spaces. When the coordinate system is not orthogonal, there are some additional terms in the expressions.

Simmonds, in his book on tensor analysis, quotes Albert Einstein saying

The magic of this theory will hardly fail to impose itself on anybody who has truly understood it; it represents a genuine triumph of the method of absolute differential calculus, founded by Gauss, Riemann, Ricci, and Levi-Civita.

Vector and tensor calculus in general curvilinear coordinates is used in tensor analysis on four-dimensional curvilinear manifolds in general relativity, in the mechanics of curved shells, in examining the invariance properties of Maxwell's equations which has been of interest in metamaterials and in many other fields.

Some useful relations in the calculus of vectors and second-order tensors in curvilinear coordinates are given in this section. The notation and contents are primarily from Ogden, Simmonds, Green and Zerna, Basar and Weichert, and Ciarlet.

Let φ = φ(x) be a well defined scalar field and v = v(x) a well-defined vector field, and λ_{1}, λ_{2}... be parameters of the coordinates

=== Geometric elements ===
1. Tangent vector: If x(λ) parametrizes a curve C in Cartesian coordinates, then
  $${\partial \mathbf{x} \over \partial \lambda} = {\partial \mathbf{x} \over \partial q^i}{\partial q^i \over \partial \lambda} = \left( h_{ki}\cfrac{\partial q^i}{\partial \lambda}\right)\mathbf{b}_k$$
  is a tangent vector to C in curvilinear coordinates (using the chain rule). Using the definition of the Lamé coefficients, and that for the metric g_{ij} = 0 when i ≠ j, the magnitude is:
  $$\left|{\partial \mathbf{x} \over \partial \lambda} \right| = \sqrt{h_{ki}h_{kj}\cfrac{\partial q^i}{\partial \lambda}\cfrac{\partial q^j}{\partial \lambda}} = \sqrt{ g_{ij}\cfrac{\partial q^i}{\partial \lambda}\cfrac{\partial q^j}{\partial \lambda}} = \sqrt{h_{i}^2\left(\cfrac{\partial q^i}{\partial \lambda}\right)^2}$$
2. Tangent plane element: If x(λ_{1}, λ_{2}) parametrizes a surface S in Cartesian coordinates, then the following cross product of tangent vectors is a normal vector to S with the magnitude of infinitesimal plane element, in curvilinear coordinates. Using the above result,
  $${\partial \mathbf{x} \over \partial \lambda_1}\times {\partial \mathbf{x} \over \partial \lambda_2} =\left({\partial \mathbf{x} \over \partial q^i}{\partial q^i \over \partial \lambda_1}\right) \times \left({\partial \mathbf{x} \over \partial q^j}{\partial q^j \over \partial \lambda_2}\right) = \mathcal{E}_{kmp}\left( h_{ki}{\partial q^i \over \partial \lambda_1}\right)\left(h_{mj}{\partial q^j \over \partial \lambda_2}\right) \mathbf{b}_p$$
  where $\mathcal{E}$ is the permutation symbol. In determinant form:
  $${\partial \mathbf{x} \over \partial \lambda_1}\times {\partial \mathbf{x} \over \partial \lambda_2}
=\begin{vmatrix}
\mathbf{e}_1 & \mathbf{e}_2 & \mathbf{e}_3 \\
h_{1i} \dfrac{\partial q^i}{\partial \lambda_1} & h_{2i} \dfrac{\partial q^i}{\partial \lambda_1} & h_{3i} \dfrac{\partial q^i }{\partial \lambda_1} \\
h_{1j} \dfrac{\partial q^j}{\partial \lambda_2} & h_{2j} \dfrac{\partial q^j}{\partial \lambda_2} & h_{3j} \dfrac{\partial q^j }{\partial \lambda_2}
\end{vmatrix}$$

=== Integration ===
Operator	Scalar field	Vector field
Line integral	$\int_C \varphi(\mathbf{x}) ds = \int_a^b \varphi(\mathbf{x}(\lambda))\left|{\partial \mathbf{x} \over \partial \lambda}\right| d\lambda$	$\int_C \mathbf{v}(\mathbf{x}) \cdot d\mathbf{s} = \int_a^b \mathbf{v}(\mathbf{x}(\lambda))\cdot\left({\partial \mathbf{x} \over \partial \lambda}\right) d\lambda$
Surface integral	$\int_S \varphi(\mathbf{x}) dS = \iint_T \varphi(\mathbf{x}(\lambda_1, \lambda_2)) \left|{\partial \mathbf{x} \over \partial \lambda_1}\times {\partial \mathbf{x} \over \partial \lambda_2}\right| d\lambda_1 d\lambda_2$	$\int_S \mathbf{v}(\mathbf{x}) \cdot dS = \iint_T \mathbf{v}(\mathbf{x}(\lambda_1, \lambda_2)) \cdot\left({\partial \mathbf{x} \over \partial \lambda_1}\times {\partial \mathbf{x} \over \partial \lambda_2}\right) d\lambda_1 d\lambda_2$
Volume integral	$\iiint_V \varphi(x,y,z) dV = \iiint_V \chi(q_1,q_2,q_3) Jdq_1dq_2dq_3$	$\iiint_V \mathbf{u}(x,y,z) dV = \iiint_V \mathbf{v}(q_1,q_2,q_3) Jdq_1dq_2dq_3$

=== Differentiation ===
The expressions for the gradient, divergence, and Laplacian can be directly extended to n-dimensions, however the curl is only defined in 3D.

The vector field b_{i} is tangent to the q^{i} coordinate curve and forms a natural basis at each point on the curve. This basis, as discussed at the beginning of this article, is also called the contravariant curvilinear basis. We can also define a reciprocal basis, or covariant curvilinear basis, b^{i}. All the algebraic relations between the basis vectors, as discussed in the section on tensor algebra, apply for the natural basis and its reciprocal at each point x.

Operator	Scalar field	Vector field	2nd order tensor field
Gradient	$\nabla\varphi = \cfrac{1}{h_i}{\partial\varphi \over \partial q^i} \mathbf{b}^i$	$\nabla\mathbf{v} = \cfrac{1}{h_i^2}{\partial \mathbf{v} \over \partial q^i}\otimes\mathbf{b}_i$	$\boldsymbol{\nabla}\boldsymbol{S} = \cfrac{\partial \boldsymbol{S}}{\partial q^i}\otimes\mathbf{b}^i$
Divergence	N/A	$\nabla \cdot \mathbf{v} = \cfrac{1}{\prod_j h_j} \frac{\partial }{\partial q^i}(v^i\prod_{j\ne i} h_j)$	$(\boldsymbol{\nabla}\cdot\boldsymbol{S})\cdot\mathbf{a} = \boldsymbol{\nabla}\cdot(\boldsymbol{S}\cdot\mathbf{a})$ where a is an arbitrary constant vector. In curvilinear coordinates, $\boldsymbol{\nabla}\cdot\boldsymbol{S} = \left[\cfrac{\partial S_{ij}}{\partial q^k} - \Gamma^l_{ki}S_{lj} - \Gamma^l_{kj}S_{il}\right]g^{ik}\mathbf{b}^j$
Laplacian	$\nabla^2 \varphi = \cfrac{1}{\prod _j h_j}\frac{\partial }{\partial q^i}\left(\cfrac{\prod _j h_j}{h_i^2}\frac{\partial \varphi}{\partial q^i}\right)$	$\nabla^2 \mathbf{v} \equiv \nabla \nabla\cdot \mathbf{v} - \nabla \times \nabla \times \mathbf{v}$ $~~~ = \hat{\mathbf{x}}\nabla^2 v_x + \hat{\mathbf{y}}\nabla^2 v_y + \hat{\mathbf{z}}\nabla^2 v_z$ (First equality in 3D only; second equality in Cartesian components only)	
Curl	N/A	For vector fields in 3D only, $\nabla\times\mathbf{v} = \frac{1}{h_1h_2h_3} \mathbf{e}_i \epsilon_{ijk} h_i \frac{\partial (h_k v_k)}{\partial q^j}$ where $\epsilon_{ijk}$ is the Levi-Civita symbol.	See Curl of a tensor field

== Fictitious forces in general curvilinear coordinates ==
By definition, if a particle with no forces acting on it has its position expressed in an inertial coordinate system, (x_{1}, x_{2}, x_{3}, t), then there it will have no acceleration (d^{2}x_{j}/dt^{2} = 0). In this context, a coordinate system can fail to be "inertial" either due to non-straight time axis or non-straight space axes (or both). In other words, the basis vectors of the coordinates may vary in time at fixed positions, or they may vary with position at fixed times, or both. When equations of motion are expressed in terms of any non-inertial coordinate system (in this sense), extra terms appear, called Christoffel symbols. Strictly speaking, these terms represent components of the absolute acceleration (in classical mechanics), but we may also choose to continue to regard d^{2}x_{j}/dt^{2} as the acceleration (as if the coordinates were inertial) and treat the extra terms as if they were forces, in which case they are called fictitious forces. The component of any such fictitious force normal to the path of the particle and in the plane of the path's curvature is then called centrifugal force.

This more general context makes clear the correspondence between the concepts of centrifugal force in rotating coordinate systems and in stationary curvilinear coordinate systems. (Both of these concepts appear frequently in the literature.) For a simple example, consider a particle of mass m moving in a circle of radius r with angular speed w relative to a system of polar coordinates rotating with angular speed W. The radial equation of motion is mr” = F_{r} + mr(w + W)^{2}. Thus the centrifugal force is mr times the square of the absolute rotational speed A = w + W of the particle. If we choose a coordinate system rotating at the speed of the particle, then W = A and w = 0, in which case the centrifugal force is mrA^{2}, whereas if we choose a stationary coordinate system we have W = 0 and w = A, in which case the centrifugal force is again mrA^{2}. The reason for this equality of results is that in both cases the basis vectors at the particle's location are changing in time in exactly the same way. Hence these are really just two different ways of describing exactly the same thing, one description being in terms of rotating coordinates and the other being in terms of stationary curvilinear coordinates, both of which are non-inertial according to the more abstract meaning of that term.

When describing general motion, the actual forces acting on a particle are often referred to the instantaneous osculating circle tangent to the path of motion, and this circle in the general case is not centered at a fixed location, and so the decomposition into centrifugal and Coriolis components is constantly changing. This is true regardless of whether the motion is described in terms of stationary or rotating coordinates.

== See also ==
- Curvilinear motion
- Covariance and contravariance
- Introduction to the mathematics of general relativity
- Special cases:
  - Orthogonal coordinates
  - Skew coordinates
- Tensors in curvilinear coordinates
- Frenet–Serret formulas
- Covariant derivative
- Tensor derivative (continuum mechanics)
- Curvilinear perspective
- Del in cylindrical and spherical coordinates
