= Green's function for the three-variable Laplace equation =

Partial differential equations

In physics, the Green's function (or fundamental solution) for the Laplacian (or Laplace operator) in three variables is used to describe the response of a particular type of physical system to a point source. In particular, this Green's function arises in systems that can be described by Poisson's equation, a partial differential equation (PDE) of the form
$$\nabla^2 u(\mathbf{x}) = f(\mathbf{x})$$
where $\nabla^2$ is the Laplace operator in $\mathbb{R}^3$, $f(\mathbf{x})$ is the source term of the system, and $u(\mathbf{x})$ is the solution to the equation. Because $\nabla^2$ is a linear differential operator, the solution $u(\mathbf{x})$ to a general system of this type can be written as an integral over a distribution of source given by $f(\mathbf{x})$:
$$u(\mathbf{x}) = \int G(\mathbf{x},\mathbf{x'})f(\mathbf{x'})d\mathbf{x}'$$
where the Green's function for Laplacian in three variables $G(\mathbf{x},\mathbf{x'})$ describes the response of the system at the point $\mathbf{x}$ to a point source located at $\mathbf{x'}$:
$$\nabla^2 G(\mathbf{x},\mathbf{x'}) = \delta(\mathbf{x}-\mathbf{x'})$$
and the point source is given by $\delta(\mathbf{x}-\mathbf{x'})$, the Dirac delta function.

== Motivation ==
One physical system of this type is a charge distribution in electrostatics. In such a system, the electric field is expressed as the negative gradient of the electric potential, and Gauss's law in differential form applies:
$$\begin{align}
\mathbf{E} &= - \mathbf{\nabla} \phi(\mathbf{x}) \\[1ex]
\boldsymbol{\nabla} \cdot \mathbf{E} &= \frac{\rho(\mathbf{x})}{\varepsilon_0}
\end{align}$$

Combining these expressions gives us Poisson's equation:
$$-\mathbf{\nabla}^2 \phi(\mathbf{x}) = \frac{\rho(\mathbf{x})}{\varepsilon_0}$$

We can find the solution $\phi(\mathbf{x})$ to this equation for an arbitrary charge distribution by first considering the distribution created by a point charge $q$ located at $\mathbf{x'}$:
$$\rho(\mathbf{x}) = q \, \delta(\mathbf{x}-\mathbf{x'})$$

In this case,
$$-\frac{\varepsilon_0}{q} \mathbf{\nabla}^2\phi(\mathbf{x}) = \delta(\mathbf{x}-\mathbf{x'})$$
which shows that $G(\mathbf{x}, \mathbf{x'})$ for $-\frac{\varepsilon_0}{q} \nabla^2$ will give the response of the system to the point charge $q$. Then, by linearity of the Laplace operator, we can express $\phi(\mathbf{x})$ as a superposition:
$$\phi(\mathbf{x}) = \int G(\mathbf{x},\mathbf{x'}) \rho(\mathbf{x'}) \,d\mathbf{x}'$$
for a general charge distribution $\rho(\mathbf{x})$.

== Mathematical exposition ==
The free-space Green's function for the Laplace operator in three variables is given in terms of the reciprocal distance between two points and is known as the "Newton kernel" or "Newtonian potential". That is to say, the solution of the equation
$$\nabla^2 G(\mathbf{x},\mathbf{x'}) = \delta(\mathbf{x}-\mathbf{x'})$$
is
$$G(\mathbf{x},\mathbf{x'}) = -\frac{1}{4\pi \left|\mathbf{x} - \mathbf{x'}\right|},$$
where $\mathbf{x}=(x,y,z)$ are the standard Cartesian coordinates in a three-dimensional space, and $\delta$ is the Dirac delta function.

The algebraic expression of the Green's function for the three-variable Laplace operator, apart from the constant term $-1/(4\pi)$ expressed in Cartesian coordinates shall be referred to as
$$\frac{1}{|\mathbf{x} - \mathbf{x'}|}
= \left[\left(x - x'\right)^2 + \left(y - y'\right)^2 + \left(z - z'\right)^2\right]^{-{1}/{2}}.$$

Many expansion formulas are possible, given the algebraic expression for the Green's function. One of the most well-known of these, the Laplace expansion for the three-variable Laplace equation, is given in terms of the generating function for Legendre polynomials,
$$\frac{1}{|\mathbf{x} - \mathbf{x'}|} = \sum_{l=0}^\infty \frac{r_<^l}{r_>^{l+1}} P_l(\cos\gamma),$$
which has been written in terms of spherical coordinates $(r,\theta,\varphi)$. The less than (greater than) notation means, take the primed or unprimed spherical radius depending on which is less than (greater than) the other. The $\gamma$ represents the angle between the two arbitrary vectors $(\mathbf{x},\mathbf{x'})$ given by
$$\cos\gamma = \cos\theta\cos\theta' + \sin\theta\sin\theta' \cos(\varphi-\varphi').$$

The free-space circular cylindrical Green's function (see below) is given in terms of the reciprocal distance between two points. The expression is derived in Jackson's Classical Electrodynamics. Using the Green's function for the three-variable Laplace operator, one can integrate the Poisson equation in order to determine the potential function. Green's functions can be expanded in terms of the basis elements (harmonic functions) which are determined using the separable coordinate systems for the linear partial differential equation. There are many expansions in terms of special functions for the Green's function. In the case of a boundary put at infinity with the boundary condition setting the solution to zero at infinity, then one has an infinite-extent Green's function. For the three-variable Laplace operator, one can for instance expand it in the rotationally invariant coordinate systems which allow separation of variables. For instance:
$$\frac{1}{|\mathbf{x} - \mathbf{x'}|} =
\frac{1}{\pi\sqrt{R R'}}
\sum_{m=-\infty}^\infty e^{im(\varphi-\varphi')} Q_{m-\frac{1}{2}}(\chi)$$
where
$$\chi = \frac{R^2 + {R'}^2 + \left(z-z'\right)^2}{2RR'}$$
and $Q_{m-\frac{1}{2}}(\chi)$ is the odd-half-integer degree Legendre function of the second kind, which is a toroidal harmonic. Here the expansion has been written in terms of cylindrical coordinates $(R,\varphi,z)$. See for instance Toroidal coordinates.

Using one of the Whipple formulae for toroidal harmonics we can obtain an alternative form of the Green's function
$$\frac{1}{|\mathbf{x} - \mathbf{x'}|} =
\sqrt{\frac{\pi}{2RR'(\chi^2-1)^{1/2}}}
\sum_{m=-\infty}^\infty \frac{\left(-1\right)^m}{\Gamma(m+1/2)}  P_{-\frac{1}{2}}^m
{\left(\frac{\chi}{\sqrt{\chi^2-1}}\right)} e^{im(\varphi-\varphi')}$$
in terms for a toroidal harmonic of the first kind.

The above expressions for the Green's function for the three-variable Laplace operator are examples of single summation expressions for this Green's function. There are also single-integral expressions for this Green's function. Examples of these can be seen to exist in rotational cylindrical coordinates as an integral Laplace transform in the difference of vertical heights whose kernel is given in terms of the order-zero Bessel function of the first kind as
$$\frac{1}{|\mathbf{x} - \mathbf{x'}|} =
\int_0^\infty J_0{\left( k\sqrt{R^2 + {R'}^2 - 2RR'\cos(\varphi-\varphi')}\right)} e^{-k(z_>-z_<)}\,dk,$$
where $z_> (z_<)$ are the greater (lesser) variables $z$ and $z'$. Similarly, the Green's function for the three-variable Laplace equation can be given as a Fourier integral cosine transform of the difference of vertical heights whose kernel is given in terms of the order-zero modified Bessel function of the second kind as
$$\frac{1}{|\mathbf{x} - \mathbf{x'}|} =
\frac{2}{\pi} \int_0^\infty K_0{\left( k\sqrt{R^2 + {R'}^2 - 2RR'\cos(\varphi-\varphi')} \right)} \cos[k(z-z')] \, dk.$$

== Rotationally invariant Green's functions for the three-variable Laplace operator ==
Green's function expansions exist in all of the rotationally invariant coordinate systems which are known to yield solutions to the three-variable Laplace equation through the separation of variables technique.

- cylindrical coordinates
- spherical coordinates
- Prolate spheroidal coordinates
- Oblate spheroidal coordinates
- Parabolic coordinates
- Toroidal coordinates
- Bispherical coordinates
- Flat-ring cyclide coordinates
- Flat-disk cyclide coordinates
- Bi-cyclide coordinates
- Cap-cyclide coordinates

== See also ==
- Newtonian potential
- Laplace expansion
