= Bipolar cylindrical coordinates =

Three-dimensional orthogonal coordinate system

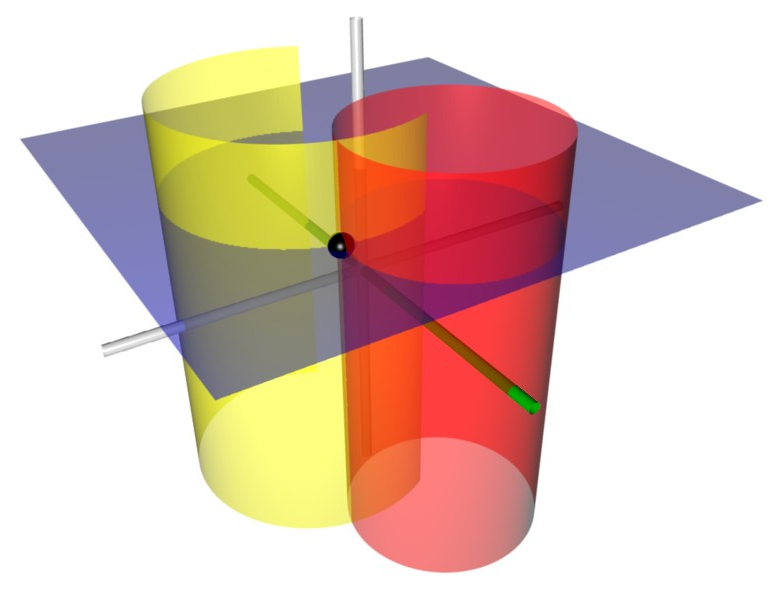
Coordinate surfaces of the bipolar cylindrical coordinates. The yellow crescent corresponds to σ, whereas the red tube corresponds to τ and the blue plane corresponds to z=1. The three surfaces intersect at the point P (shown as a black sphere).

Bipolar cylindrical coordinates are a three-dimensional orthogonal coordinate system that results from projecting the two-dimensional bipolar coordinate system in the perpendicular $z$-direction. The two lines of foci $F_{1}$ and $F_{2}$ of the projected Apollonian circles are generally taken to be defined by $x=-a$ and $x=+a$, respectively, (and by $y=0$) in the Cartesian coordinate system.

The term "bipolar" is often used to describe other curves having two singular points (foci), such as ellipses, hyperbolas, and Cassini ovals. However, the term bipolar coordinates is never used to describe coordinates associated with those curves, e.g., elliptic coordinates.

== Basic definition ==
The most common definition of bipolar cylindrical coordinates $(\sigma, \tau, z)$ is

$$x = a \ \frac{\sinh \tau}{\cosh \tau - \cos \sigma}$$

$$y = a \ \frac{\sin \sigma}{\cosh \tau - \cos \sigma}$$

$$z = \ z$$

where the $\sigma$ coordinate of a point $P$ equals the angle $F_{1} P F_{2}$ and the $\tau$ coordinate equals the natural logarithm of the ratio of the distances $d_{1}$ and $d_{2}$ to the focal lines

$$\tau = \ln \frac{d_{1}}{d_{2}}$$

(Recall that the focal lines $F_{1}$ and $F_{2}$ are located at $x=-a$ and $x=+a$, respectively.)

Surfaces of constant $\sigma$ correspond to cylinders of different radii

$$x^{2} +
\left( y - a \cot \sigma \right)^{2} = \frac{a^{2}}{\sin^{2} \sigma}$$

that all pass through the focal lines and are not concentric. The surfaces of constant $\tau$ are non-intersecting cylinders of different radii

$$y^{2} +
\left( x - a \coth \tau \right)^{2} = \frac{a^{2}}{\sinh^{2} \tau}$$

that surround the focal lines but again are not concentric. The focal lines and all these cylinders are parallel to the $z$-axis (the direction of projection). In the $z=0$ plane, the centers of the constant-$\sigma$ and constant-$\tau$ cylinders lie on the $y$ and $x$ axes, respectively.

== Scale factors ==
The scale factors for the bipolar coordinates $\sigma$ and $\tau$ are equal

$$h_{\sigma} = h_{\tau} = \frac{a}{\cosh \tau - \cos\sigma}$$

whereas the remaining scale factor $h_{z}=1$. Thus, the infinitesimal volume element equals

$$dV = \frac{a^{2}}{\left( \cosh \tau - \cos\sigma \right)^{2}} d\sigma d\tau dz$$

and the Laplacian is given by

$$\nabla^{2} \Phi =
\frac{1}{a^{2}} \left( \cosh \tau - \cos\sigma \right)^{2}
\left(
\frac{\partial^{2} \Phi}{\partial \sigma^{2}} +
\frac{\partial^{2} \Phi}{\partial \tau^{2}}
\right) +
\frac{\partial^{2} \Phi}{\partial z^{2}}$$

Other differential operators such as $\nabla \cdot \mathbf{F}$ and $\nabla \times \mathbf{F}$ can be expressed in the coordinates $(\sigma, \tau)$ by substituting the scale factors into the general formulae found in orthogonal coordinates.

== Applications ==
The classic applications of bipolar coordinates are in solving partial differential equations, e.g., Laplace's equation or the Helmholtz equation, for which bipolar coordinates allow a separation of variables (in 2D). A typical example would be the electric field surrounding two parallel cylindrical conductors.

== Bibliography ==
- Margenau H, Murphy GM (1956). The Mathematics of Physics and Chemistry. New York: D. van Nostrand. pp. 187–190. LCCN 55010911.
- Korn GA, Korn TM (1961). Mathematical Handbook for Scientists and Engineers. New York: McGraw-Hill. p. 182. LCCN 59014456. ASIN B0000CKZX7.
- Moon P, Spencer DE (1988). "Conical Coordinates (r, θ, λ)". Field Theory Handbook, Including Coordinate Systems, Differential Equations, and Their Solutions (corrected 2nd ed., 3rd print ed.). New York: Springer-Verlag. unknown. ISBN 978-0-387-18430-2.
