= Elliptic cylindrical coordinates =

Three-dimensional orthogonal coordinate system

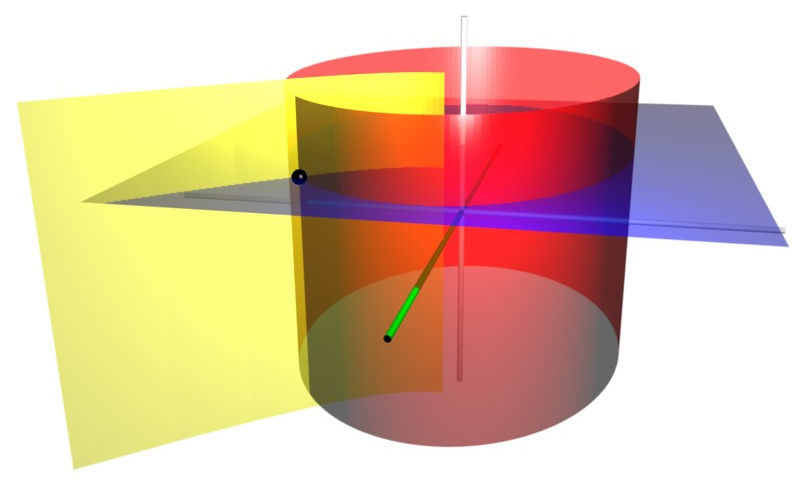
Coordinate surfaces of elliptic cylindrical coordinates. The yellow sheet is the prism of a half-hyperbola corresponding to ν=-45°, whereas the red tube is an elliptical prism corresponding to μ=1. The blue sheet corresponds to z=1. The three surfaces intersect at the point P (shown as a black sphere) with Cartesian coordinates roughly (2.182, −1.661, 1.0). The foci of the ellipse and hyperbola lie at x = ±2.0.

Elliptic cylindrical coordinates are a three-dimensional orthogonal coordinate system that results from projecting the two-dimensional elliptic coordinate system in the perpendicular $z$-direction. Hence, the coordinate surfaces are prisms of confocal ellipses and hyperbolae. The two foci $F_{1}$ and $F_{2}$ are generally taken to be fixed at $-a$ and $+a$, respectively, on the $x$-axis of the Cartesian coordinate system.

== Basic definition ==
The most common definition of elliptic cylindrical coordinates $(\mu, \nu, z)$ is

$$x = a \ \cosh \mu \ \cos \nu$$

$$y = a \ \sinh \mu \ \sin \nu$$

$$z = z$$

where $\mu$ is a nonnegative real number and $\nu \in [0, 2\pi]$.

These definitions correspond to ellipses and hyperbolae. The trigonometric identity

$$\frac{x^{2}}{a^{2} \cosh^{2} \mu} + \frac{y^{2}}{a^{2} \sinh^{2} \mu} = \cos^{2} \nu + \sin^{2} \nu = 1$$

shows that curves of constant $\mu$ form ellipses, whereas the hyperbolic trigonometric identity

$$\frac{x^{2}}{a^{2} \cos^{2} \nu} - \frac{y^{2}}{a^{2} \sin^{2} \nu} = \cosh^{2} \mu - \sinh^{2} \mu = 1$$

shows that curves of constant $\nu$ form hyperbolae.

== Scale factors ==
The scale factors for the elliptic cylindrical coordinates $\mu$ and $\nu$ are equal

$$h_{\mu} = h_{\nu} = a\sqrt{\sinh^{2}\mu + \sin^{2}\nu}$$

whereas the remaining scale factor $h_{z}=1$. Consequently, an infinitesimal volume element equals

$$dV = a^{2} \left( \sinh^{2}\mu + \sin^{2}\nu \right) d\mu d\nu dz$$

and the Laplacian equals

$$\nabla^{2} \Phi = \frac{1}{a^{2} \left( \sinh^{2}\mu + \sin^{2}\nu \right)} \left( \frac{\partial^{2} \Phi}{\partial \mu^{2}} + \frac{\partial^{2} \Phi}{\partial \nu^{2}} \right) + \frac{\partial^{2} \Phi}{\partial z^{2}}$$

Other differential operators such as $\nabla \cdot \mathbf{F}$ and $\nabla \times \mathbf{F}$ can be expressed in the coordinates $(\mu, \nu, z)$ by substituting the scale factors into the general formulae found in orthogonal coordinates.

== Alternative definition ==
An alternative and geometrically intuitive set of elliptic coordinates $(\sigma, \tau, z)$ are sometimes used, where $\sigma = \cosh \mu$ and $\tau = \cos \nu$. Hence, the curves of constant $\sigma$ are ellipses, whereas the curves of constant $\tau$ are hyperbolae. The coordinate $\tau$ must belong to the interval [−1, 1], whereas the $\sigma$ coordinate must be greater than or equal to one.

The coordinates $(\sigma, \tau, z)$ have a simple relation to the distances to the foci $F_{1}$ and $F_{2}$. For any point in the (x,y) plane, the sum $d_{1}+d_{2}$ of its distances to the foci equals $2a\sigma$, whereas their difference $d_{1}-d_{2}$ equals $2a\tau$. Thus, the distance to $F_{1}$ is $a(\sigma+\tau)$, whereas the distance to $F_{2}$ is $a(\sigma-\tau)$. (Recall that $F_{1}$ and $F_{2}$ are located at $x=-a$ and $x=+a$, respectively.)

A drawback of these coordinates is that they do not have a 1-to-1 transformation to the Cartesian coordinates

$$x = a\sigma\tau$$

$$y^{2} = a^{2} \left( \sigma^{2} - 1 \right) \left(1 - \tau^{2} \right)$$

== Alternative scale factors ==
The scale factors for the alternative elliptic coordinates $(\sigma, \tau, z)$ are

$$h_{\sigma} = a\sqrt{\frac{\sigma^{2} - \tau^{2}}{\sigma^{2} - 1}}$$

$$h_{\tau} = a\sqrt{\frac{\sigma^{2} - \tau^{2}}{1 - \tau^{2}}}$$

and, of course, $h_{z}=1$. Hence, the infinitesimal volume element becomes

$$dV = a^{2} \frac{\sigma^{2} - \tau^{2}}{\sqrt{\left( \sigma^{2} - 1 \right) \left( 1 - \tau^{2} \right)}} d\sigma d\tau dz$$

and the Laplacian equals

$$\nabla^{2} \Phi =
\frac{1}{a^{2} \left( \sigma^{2} - \tau^{2} \right) }
\left[
\sqrt{\sigma^{2} - 1} \frac{\partial}{\partial \sigma}
\left( \sqrt{\sigma^{2} - 1} \frac{\partial \Phi}{\partial \sigma} \right) +
\sqrt{1 - \tau^{2}} \frac{\partial}{\partial \tau}
\left( \sqrt{1 - \tau^{2}} \frac{\partial \Phi}{\partial \tau} \right)
\right] +
\frac{\partial^{2} \Phi}{\partial z^{2}}$$

Other differential operators such as $\nabla \cdot \mathbf{F}$ and $\nabla \times \mathbf{F}$ can be expressed in the coordinates $(\sigma, \tau)$ by substituting the scale factors into the general formulae found in orthogonal coordinates.

== Applications ==
The classic applications of elliptic cylindrical coordinates are in solving partial differential equations, e.g., Laplace's equation or the Helmholtz equation, for which elliptic cylindrical coordinates allow a separation of variables. A typical example would be the electric field surrounding a flat conducting plate of width $2a$.

The three-dimensional wave equation, when expressed in elliptic cylindrical coordinates, may be solved by separation of variables, leading to the Mathieu differential equations.

The geometric properties of elliptic coordinates can also be useful. A typical example might involve an integration over all pairs of vectors $\mathbf{p}$ and $\mathbf{q}$ that sum to a fixed vector $\mathbf{r} = \mathbf{p} + \mathbf{q}$, where the integrand was a function of the vector lengths $\left| \mathbf{p} \right|$ and $\left| \mathbf{q} \right|$. (In such a case, one would position $\mathbf{r}$ between the two foci and aligned with the $x$-axis, i.e., $\mathbf{r} = 2a \mathbf{\hat{x}}$.) For concreteness, $\mathbf{r}$, $\mathbf{p}$ and $\mathbf{q}$ could represent the momenta of a particle and its decomposition products, respectively, and the integrand might involve the kinetic energies of the products (which are proportional to the squared lengths of the momenta).

== Bibliography ==
- Morse PM, Feshbach H (1953). Methods of Theoretical Physics, Part I. New York: McGraw-Hill. p. 657. ISBN 0-07-043316-X. LCCN 52011515.
- Margenau H, Murphy GM (1956). The Mathematics of Physics and Chemistry. New York: D. van Nostrand. pp. 182–183. LCCN 55010911.
- Korn GA, Korn TM (1961). Mathematical Handbook for Scientists and Engineers. New York: McGraw-Hill. p. 179. LCCN 59014456. ASIN B0000CKZX7.
- Sauer R, Szabó I (1967). Mathematische Hilfsmittel des Ingenieurs. New York: Springer Verlag. p. 97. LCCN 67025285.
- Zwillinger D (1992). Handbook of Integration. Boston, MA: Jones and Bartlett. p. 114. ISBN 0-86720-293-9. Same as Morse & Feshbach (1953), substituting u_{k} for ξ_{k}.
- Moon P, Spencer DE (1988). "Elliptic-Cylinder Coordinates (η, ψ, z)". Field Theory Handbook, Including Coordinate Systems, Differential Equations, and Their Solutions (corrected 2nd ed., 3rd print ed.). New York: Springer-Verlag. pp. 17–20 (Table 1.03). ISBN 978-0-387-18430-2.
