= Polar plotter =

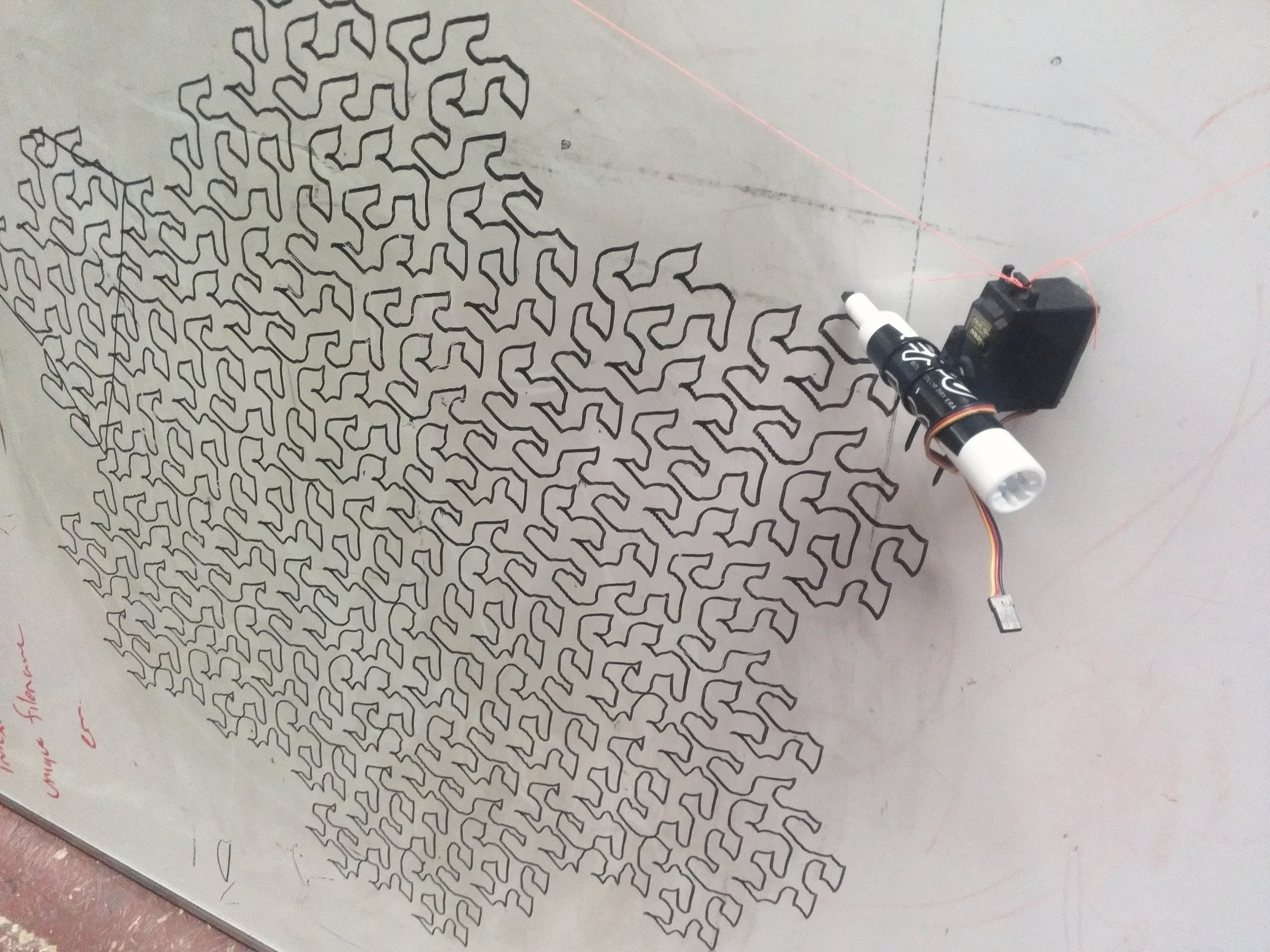
A fourth stage Gosper curve plotted on a whiteboard polargraph.

A polar plotter also known as polargraph or Kritzler is a plotter which uses two-center bipolar coordinates to produce vector drawings using a pen suspended from strings connected to two pulleys at the top of the plotting surface. This gives it two degrees of freedom and allows it to scale to fairly large drawings simply by moving the motors further apart and using longer strings. Some polar plotters will integrate a raising mechanism for the pen which allows lines to be broken while drawing.

The system has been used by a number of artists and makers, including:

- Jürg Lehni & Uli Franke (2002)
- Ben Leduc-Mills (2010)
- Alex Weber (2011)
- Harvey Moon
- Sandy Nobel (2012)
- Maslow CNC
