= Two-center bipolar coordinates =

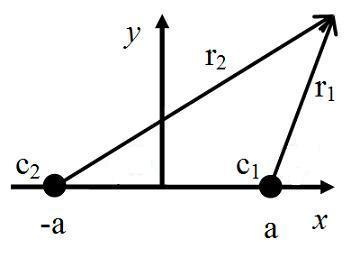
Two-center bipolar coordinates.

In mathematics, two-center bipolar coordinates is a coordinate system based on two coordinates which give distances from two fixed centers $c_1$ and $c_2$. This system is very useful in some scientific applications (e.g. calculating the electric field of a dipole on a plane).

== Transformation to Cartesian coordinates ==
When the centers are at $(+a, 0)$ and $(-a, 0)$, the transformation to Cartesian coordinates $(x, y)$ from two-center bipolar coordinates $(r_1, r_2)$ is

$$x = \frac{r_2^2-r_1^2}{4a}$$

$y = \pm \frac{1}{4a}\sqrt{16a^2r_2^2-(r_2^2-r_1^2+4a^2)^2}$

== Transformation to polar coordinates ==
When x > 0, the transformation to polar coordinates from two-center bipolar coordinates is

$$r = \sqrt{\frac{r_1^2+r_2^2-2a^2}{2}}$$

$$\theta = \arctan\left( \frac{\sqrt{r_1^4-8a^2r_1^2-2r_1^2r_2^2-(4a^2-r_2^2)^2}}{r_2^2-r_1^2} \right)$$

where $2 a$ is the distance between the poles (coordinate system centers).

== Applications ==
Polar plotters use two-center bipolar coordinates to describe the drawing paths required to draw a target image.

== See also ==
- Bipolar coordinates
- Biangular coordinates
- Lemniscate of Bernoulli
- Oval of Cassini
- Cartesian oval
- Ellipse
