= Ellipsoidal coordinates =

Three-dimensional coordinate system

Ellipsoidal coordinates are a three-dimensional orthogonal coordinate system $(\lambda, \mu, \nu)$ that generalizes the two-dimensional elliptic coordinate system. Unlike most three-dimensional orthogonal coordinates that feature quadratic coordinate surfaces, the ellipsoidal coordinate system is based on confocal quadrics.

== Basic formulae ==
The Cartesian coordinates $(x, y, z)$ can be produced from the ellipsoidal coordinates $( \lambda, \mu, \nu )$ by the equations

$$x^{2} = \frac{\left( a^{2} + \lambda \right) \left( a^{2} + \mu \right) \left( a^{2} + \nu \right)}{\left( a^{2} - b^{2}  \right) \left( a^{2} - c^{2} \right)}$$

$$y^{2} = \frac{\left( b^{2} + \lambda \right) \left( b^{2} + \mu \right) \left( b^{2} + \nu \right)}{\left( b^{2} - a^{2}  \right) \left( b^{2} - c^{2} \right)}$$

$$z^{2} = \frac{\left( c^{2} + \lambda \right) \left( c^{2} + \mu \right) \left( c^{2} + \nu \right)}{\left( c^{2} - b^{2}  \right) \left( c^{2} - a^{2} \right)}$$

where the following limits apply to the coordinates

$$- \lambda < c^{2} < - \mu < b^{2} < -\nu < a^{2}.$$

Consequently, surfaces of constant $\lambda$ are ellipsoids

$$\frac{x^{2}}{a^{2} + \lambda} +  \frac{y^{2}}{b^{2} + \lambda} + \frac{z^{2}}{c^{2} + \lambda} = 1,$$

whereas surfaces of constant $\mu$ are hyperboloids of one sheet

$$\frac{x^{2}}{a^{2} + \mu} +  \frac{y^{2}}{b^{2} + \mu} + \frac{z^{2}}{c^{2} + \mu} = 1,$$

because the last term in the lhs is negative, and surfaces of constant $\nu$ are hyperboloids of two sheets

$$\frac{x^{2}}{a^{2} + \nu} +  \frac{y^{2}}{b^{2} + \nu} + \frac{z^{2}}{c^{2} + \nu} = 1$$

because the last two terms in the lhs are negative.

The orthogonal system of quadrics used for the ellipsoidal coordinates are confocal quadrics.

== Scale factors and differential operators ==
For brevity in the equations below, we introduce a function

$$S(\sigma) \ \stackrel{\mathrm{def}}{=}\  \left( a^{2} + \sigma \right) \left( b^{2} + \sigma \right) \left( c^{2} + \sigma \right)$$

where $\sigma$ can represent any of the three variables $(\lambda, \mu, \nu )$. Using this function, the scale factors can be written

$$h_{\lambda} = \frac{1}{2} \sqrt{\frac{\left( \lambda - \mu \right) \left( \lambda - \nu\right)}{S(\lambda)}}$$

$$h_{\mu} = \frac{1}{2} \sqrt{\frac{\left( \mu - \lambda\right) \left( \mu - \nu\right)}{S(\mu)}}$$

$$h_{\nu} = \frac{1}{2} \sqrt{\frac{\left( \nu - \lambda\right) \left( \nu - \mu\right)}{S(\nu)}}$$

Hence, the infinitesimal volume element equals

$$dV = \frac{\left( \lambda - \mu \right) \left( \lambda - \nu \right) \left( \mu - \nu\right)}{8\sqrt{-S(\lambda) S(\mu) S(\nu)}} \, d\lambda \, d\mu \, d\nu$$

and the Laplacian is defined by

$$\begin{align}
\nabla^{2} \Phi = {} &
\frac{4\sqrt{S(\lambda)}}{\left( \lambda - \mu \right) \left( \lambda - \nu\right)}
\frac{\partial}{\partial \lambda} \left[ \sqrt{S(\lambda)} \frac{\partial \Phi}{\partial \lambda} \right] \\[1ex]
& +
\frac{4\sqrt{S(\mu)}}{\left( \mu - \lambda \right) \left( \mu - \nu\right)}
\frac{\partial}{\partial \mu} \left[ \sqrt{S(\mu)} \frac{\partial \Phi}{\partial \mu} \right] \\[1ex]
& +
\frac{4\sqrt{S(\nu)}}{\left( \nu - \lambda \right) \left( \nu - \mu\right)}
\frac{\partial}{\partial \nu} \left[ \sqrt{S(\nu)} \frac{\partial \Phi}{\partial \nu} \right]
\end{align}$$

Other differential operators such as $\nabla \cdot \mathbf{F}$ and $\nabla \times \mathbf{F}$ can be expressed in the coordinates $(\lambda, \mu, \nu)$ by substituting the scale factors into the general formulae found in orthogonal coordinates.

== Angular parametrization ==
An alternative (but non-orthogonal) parametrization exists that closely follows the angular parametrization of spherical coordinates:

$$x = a s \sin\theta \cos\phi,$$
$$y = b s \sin\theta \sin\phi,$$
$$z = c s \cos\theta.$$

Here, $s>0$ parametrizes the concentric ellipsoids around the origin and $\theta\in[0,\pi]$ and $\phi\in [0,2\pi]$ are the usual polar and azimuthal angles of spherical coordinates, respectively. The corresponding volume element is

$$dx \, dy \, dz = a b c \, s^2 \sin\theta \, ds \, d\theta \, d\phi.$$

== See also ==
- Ellipsoidal latitude
- Focaloid (shell given by two coordinate surfaces)
- Map projection of the triaxial ellipsoid

== Bibliography ==
- Morse PM, Feshbach H (1953). Methods of Theoretical Physics, Part I. New York: McGraw-Hill. p. 663.
- Zwillinger D (1992). Handbook of Integration. Boston, MA: Jones and Bartlett. p. 114. ISBN 0-86720-293-9.
- Sauer R, Szabó I (1967). Mathematische Hilfsmittel des Ingenieurs. New York: Springer Verlag. pp. 101–102. LCCN 67025285.
- Korn GA, Korn TM (1961). Mathematical Handbook for Scientists and Engineers. New York: McGraw-Hill. p. 176. LCCN 59014456.
- Margenau H, Murphy GM (1956). The Mathematics of Physics and Chemistry. New York: D. van Nostrand. pp. 178–180. LCCN 55010911.
- Moon PH, Spencer DE (1988). "Ellipsoidal Coordinates (η, θ, λ)". Field Theory Handbook, Including Coordinate Systems, Differential Equations, and Their Solutions (corrected 2nd, 3rd print ed.). New York: Springer Verlag. pp. 40–44 (Table 1.10). ISBN 0-387-02732-7.

=== Unusual convention ===
- Landau LD, Lifshitz EM, Pitaevskii LP (1984). Electrodynamics of Continuous Media (Volume 8 of the Course of Theoretical Physics) (2nd ed.). New York: Pergamon Press. pp. 19–29. ISBN 978-0-7506-2634-7. Uses (ξ, η, ζ) coordinates that have the units of distance squared.
