= Henrik Petrini =

Swedish mathematician

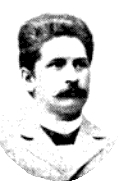
- Henrik Petrini
- Born: 15 April 1863; Falun
- Died: October 6, 1957 (aged 94); Stockholm
- Citizenship: Swedish
- Education: Uppsala University
- Scientific career
- Fields: Mathematics
- Thesis: (1890)

Henrik Petrini (15 April 1863 – 6 October 1957) was a Swedish mathematician. His mathematical contributions are mainly connected with the theory of partial differential equations, in particular potential theory.

He was born in Falun and received his PhD in 1890 from Uppsala University in mechanics, where he subsequently held a position as professor. In 1901 he moved to Växjö, where he worked as a lektor for mathematics and physics at the gymnasium. In 1914 he finally moved to Stockholm. He is best known for his counterexample of a continuous function for which the Newton potential is not twice differentiable. He was also interested in pedagogical and theological questions and was known to the general public for his radical writings.
