= Map projection of the triaxial ellipsoid =

In geodesy, a map projection of the triaxial ellipsoid maps Earth or some other astronomical body modeled as a triaxial ellipsoid to the plane. Such a model is called the reference ellipsoid. In most cases, reference ellipsoids are spheroids, and sometimes spheres. Massive objects have sufficient gravity to overcome their own rigidity and usually have an oblate ellipsoid shape. However, minor moons or small solar system bodies are not under hydrostatic equilibrium. Usually such bodies have irregular shapes. Furthermore, some of gravitationally rounded objects may have a tri-axial ellipsoid shape due to rapid rotation (such as Haumea) or unidirectional strong tidal forces (such as Io).

== Examples ==
A triaxial equivalent of the Mercator projection was developed by John P. Snyder.

Equidistant map projections of a triaxial ellipsoid were developed by Paweł Pędzich.

Conic Projections of a triaxial ellipsoid were developed by Maxim Nyrtsov.

Equal-area cylindrical and azimuthal projections of the triaxial ellipsoid were developed by Maxim Nyrtsov.

Jacobi conformal projections were described by Carl Gustav Jacob Jacobi.

== See also ==
- Geodesics on a triaxial ellipsoid
- Map projection
- Reference ellipsoid
- Jacobi ellipsoid
- Latitude
- Ellipsoidal coordinates
- Planetary coordinate system
