= Biangular coordinates =

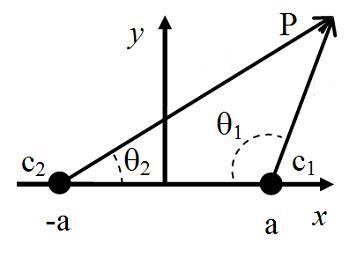
Biangular coordinates

In mathematics, biangular coordinates are a coordinate system for the plane where $C_1$ and $C_2$ are two fixed points, and the position of a point P not on the line $\overline{C_1C_2}$ is determined by the angles $\angle PC_1C_2$ and $\angle PC_2C_1.$

The sine rule can be used to convert from biangular coordinates to two-center bipolar coordinates.

== Applications ==
Biangular coordinates can be used in geometric modelling and CAD.

== See also ==
- Two-center bipolar coordinates
- Bipolar coordinates
- Sectrix of Maclaurin
