= Newtonian potential =

Green's function for Laplacian

In mathematics, the Newtonian potential, or Newton potential, is an operator in vector calculus that acts as the inverse to the negative Laplacian on functions that are smooth and decay rapidly enough at infinity. As such, it is a fundamental object of study in potential theory. In its general nature, it is a singular integral operator, defined by convolution with a function having a mathematical singularity at the origin, the Newtonian kernel $\Gamma$ which is the fundamental solution of the Laplace equation. It is named for Isaac Newton, who first discovered it and proved that it was a harmonic function in the special case of three variables, where it served as the fundamental gravitational potential in Newton's law of universal gravitation. In modern potential theory, the Newtonian potential is instead thought of as an electrostatic potential.

The Newtonian potential of a compactly supported integrable function $f$ is defined as the convolution

$$u(x) = \Gamma * f(x) = \int_{\mathbb{R}^d} \Gamma(x-y)f(y)\,dy$$

where the Newtonian kernel $\Gamma$ in dimension $d$ is defined by

$$\Gamma(x) = \begin{cases}
\frac{1}{2\pi} \log{ | x | }, &  d=2, \\
\frac{1}{d(2-d)\omega_d} | x | ^{2-d}, &  d \neq 2.
\end{cases}$$

Here $\omega_d$ is the volume of the unit d-ball (sometimes sign conventions may vary; compare (Evans 1998) and (Gilbarg & Trudinger 1983)). For example, for $d = 3$ we have $\Gamma(x) = -1/(4\pi |x|)$.

The Newtonian potential $w$ of $f$ is a solution of the Poisson equation

$$\Delta w = f,$$

which is to say that the operation of taking the Newtonian potential of a function is a partial inverse to the Laplace operator. Then $w$ will be a classical solution, that is twice differentiable, if $f$ is bounded and locally Hölder continuous as shown by Otto Hölder. It was an open question whether continuity alone is also sufficient. This was shown to be wrong by Henrik Petrini who gave an example of a continuous $f$ for which $w$ is not twice differentiable. The solution is not unique, since addition of any harmonic function to $w$ will not affect the equation. This fact can be used to prove existence and uniqueness of solutions to the Dirichlet problem for the Poisson equation in suitably regular domains, and for suitably well-behaved functions $f$: one first applies a Newtonian potential to obtain a solution, and then adjusts by adding a harmonic function to get the correct boundary data.

The Newtonian potential is defined more broadly as the convolution

$$\Gamma*\mu(x) = \int_{\mathbb{R}^d}\Gamma(x-y) \, d\mu(y)$$

when $\mu$ is a compactly supported Radon measure. It satisfies the Poisson equation

$$\Delta w = \mu$$

in the sense of distributions. Moreover, when the measure is positive, the Newtonian potential is subharmonic on $\mathbb{R}^d$.

If $f$ is a compactly supported continuous function (or, more generally, a finite measure) that is rotationally invariant, then the convolution of $f$ with $\Gamma$ satisfies for $x$ outside the support of $f$

$$f*\Gamma(x) =\lambda \Gamma(x),\quad \lambda=\int_{\mathbb{R}^d} f(y)\,dy.$$

In dimension $d=3$, this reduces to Newton's theorem that the potential energy of a small mass outside a much larger spherically symmetric mass distribution is the same as if all of the mass of the larger object were concentrated at its center.

When the measure $\mu$ is associated to a mass distribution on a sufficiently smooth hypersurface $S$ (a Lyapunov surface of Hölder class $C^{1,\alpha}$) that divides $\mathbb{R}^d$ into two regions $D_+$ and $D_-$, then the Newtonian potential of $\mu$ is referred to as a simple layer potential. Simple layer potentials are continuous and solve the Laplace equation except on $S$. They appear naturally in the study of electrostatics in the context of the electrostatic potential associated to a charge distribution on a closed surface. If $\mathrm{d}\mu=f\mathrm{d}H$ is the product of a continuous function on $S$ with the $(d-1)$-dimensional Hausdorff measure, then at a point $y$ of $S$, the normal derivative undergoes a jump discontinuity $f(y)$ when crossing the layer. Furthermore, the normal derivative of $w$ is a well-defined continuous function on $S$. This makes simple layers particularly suited to the study of the Neumann problem for the Laplace equation.

== See also ==
- Double layer potential
- Green's function
- Riesz potential
- Green's function for the three-variable Laplace equation
