= Bispherical coordinates =

Three-dimensional orthogonal coordinate system

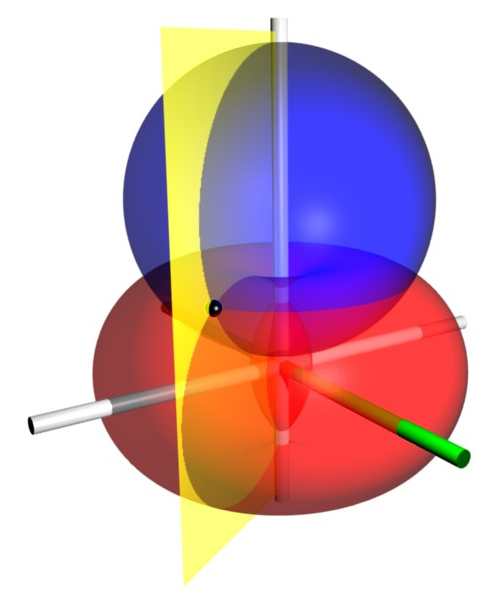
Illustration of bispherical coordinates, which are obtained by rotating a two-dimensional bipolar coordinate system about the axis joining its two foci. The foci are located at distance 1 from the vertical z-axis. The red self-intersecting torus is the σ=45° isosurface, the blue sphere is the τ=0.5 isosurface, and the yellow half-plane is the φ=60° isosurface. The green half-plane marks the x-z plane, from which φ is measured. The black point is located at the intersection of the red, blue and yellow isosurfaces, at Cartesian coordinates roughly (0.841, −1.456, 1.239).

Bispherical coordinates are a three-dimensional orthogonal coordinate system that results from rotating the two-dimensional bipolar coordinate system about the axis that connects the two foci. Thus, the two foci $F_{1}$ and $F_{2}$ in bipolar coordinates remain points (on the $z$-axis, the axis of rotation) in the bispherical coordinate system.

== Definition ==
The most common definition of bispherical coordinates $(\tau, \sigma, \phi)$ is

$$\begin{align}
x &= a \ \frac{\sin \sigma}{\cosh \tau - \cos \sigma} \cos \phi, \\
y &= a \ \frac{\sin \sigma}{\cosh \tau - \cos \sigma} \sin \phi, \\
z &= a \ \frac{\sinh \tau}{\cosh \tau - \cos \sigma},
\end{align}$$

where the $\sigma$ coordinate of a point $P$ equals the angle $F_{1} P F_{2}$ and the $\tau$ coordinate equals the natural logarithm of the ratio of the distances $d_{1}$ and $d_{2}$ to the foci

$$\tau = \ln \frac{d_{1}}{d_{2}}$$

The coordinates ranges are −∞ < $\tau$ < ∞, 0 ≤ $\sigma$ ≤ $\pi$ and 0 ≤ $\phi$ ≤ 2$\pi$.

=== Coordinate surfaces ===
Surfaces of constant $\sigma$ correspond to intersecting tori of different radii

$$z^{2} +
\left( \sqrt{x^2 + y^2} - a \cot \sigma \right)^2 = \frac{a^2}{\sin^2 \sigma}$$

that all pass through the foci but are not concentric. The surfaces of constant $\tau$ are non-intersecting spheres of different radii

$$\left( x^2 + y^2 \right) +
\left( z - a \coth \tau \right)^2 = \frac{a^2}{\sinh^2 \tau}$$

that surround the foci. The centers of the constant-$\tau$ spheres lie along the $z$-axis, whereas the constant-$\sigma$ tori are centered in the $xy$ plane.

=== Inverse formulae ===
The formulae for the inverse transformation are:

$$\begin{align}
\sigma &= \arccos\left(\dfrac{R^2-a^2}{Q}\right), \\
\tau &= \operatorname{arsinh}\left(\dfrac{2az}{Q}\right), \\
\phi &= \arctan\left(\dfrac{y}{x}\right),
\end{align}$$

where $R = \sqrt{x^2 + y^2 + z^2}$ and $Q = \sqrt{\left(R^2 + a^2\right)^2 - \left(2 a z\right)^2}.$

=== Scale factors ===
The scale factors for the bispherical coordinates $\sigma$ and $\tau$ are equal

$$h_\sigma = h_\tau = \frac{a}{\cosh \tau - \cos\sigma}$$

whereas the azimuthal scale factor equals

$$h_\phi = \frac{a \sin \sigma}{\cosh \tau - \cos\sigma}$$

Thus, the infinitesimal volume element equals

$$dV = \frac{a^3 \sin \sigma}{\left( \cosh \tau - \cos\sigma \right)^3} \, d\sigma \, d\tau \, d\phi$$

and the Laplacian is given by

$$\begin{align}
\nabla^2 \Phi =
\frac{\left( \cosh \tau - \cos\sigma \right)^3}{a^2 \sin \sigma}
& \left[
\frac{\partial}{\partial \sigma}
\left( \frac{\sin \sigma}{\cosh \tau - \cos\sigma}
\frac{\partial \Phi}{\partial \sigma}
\right) \right. \\[8pt]
&{} \quad + \left.
\sin \sigma \frac{\partial}{\partial \tau}
\left( \frac{1}{\cosh \tau - \cos\sigma}
\frac{\partial \Phi}{\partial \tau}
\right) +
\frac{1}{\sin \sigma \left( \cosh \tau - \cos\sigma \right)}
\frac{\partial^2 \Phi}{\partial \phi^2}
\right]
\end{align}$$

Other differential operators such as $\nabla \cdot \mathbf{F}$ and $\nabla \times \mathbf{F}$ can be expressed in the coordinates $(\sigma, \tau)$ by substituting the scale factors into the general formulae found in orthogonal coordinates.

== Applications ==
The classic applications of bispherical coordinates are in solving partial differential equations, e.g., Laplace's equation, for which bispherical coordinates allow a separation of variables. However, the Helmholtz equation is not separable in bispherical coordinates. A typical example would be the electric field surrounding two conducting spheres of different radii.

== Bibliography ==
- Morse PM, Feshbach H (1953). Methods of Theoretical Physics, Parts I and II. New York: McGraw-Hill. pp. 665–666, 1298–1301.
- Korn GA, Korn TM (1961). Mathematical Handbook for Scientists and Engineers. New York: McGraw-Hill. p. 182. LCCN 59014456.
- Zwillinger D (1992). Handbook of Integration. Boston, MA: Jones and Bartlett. p. 113. ISBN 0-86720-293-9.
- Moon PH, Spencer DE (1988). "Bispherical Coordinates (η, θ, ψ)". Field Theory Handbook, Including Coordinate Systems, Differential Equations, and Their Solutions (corrected 2nd ed., 3rd print ed.). New York: Springer Verlag. pp. 110–112 (Section IV, E4Rx). ISBN 0-387-02732-7.
