= Elliptic coordinate system =

2D coordinate system whose coordinate lines are confocal ellipses and hyperbolae

Elliptic coordinate system

In geometry, the elliptic coordinate system is a two-dimensional orthogonal coordinate system in which the coordinate lines are confocal ellipses and hyperbolae. The two foci $F_{1}$ and $F_{2}$ are generally taken to be fixed at $-a$ and $+a$, respectively, on the $x$-axis of the Cartesian coordinate system.

== Basic definition ==
The most common definition of elliptic coordinates $(\mu, \nu)$ is

$$\begin{align}
x &= a \ \cosh \mu \ \cos \nu \\
y &= a \ \sinh \mu \ \sin \nu
\end{align}$$

where $\mu$ is a nonnegative real number and $\nu \in [0, 2\pi].$

On the complex plane, an equivalent relationship is

$$x + iy = a \ \cosh(\mu + i\nu)$$

These definitions correspond to ellipses and hyperbolae. The trigonometric identity

$$\frac{x^{2}}{a^{2} \cosh^{2} \mu} + \frac{y^{2}}{a^{2} \sinh^{2} \mu} = \cos^{2} \nu + \sin^{2} \nu = 1$$

shows that curves of constant $\mu$ form ellipses, whereas the hyperbolic trigonometric identity

$$\frac{x^{2}}{a^{2} \cos^{2} \nu} - \frac{y^{2}}{a^{2} \sin^{2} \nu} = \cosh^{2} \mu - \sinh^{2} \mu = 1$$

shows that curves of constant $\nu$ form hyperbolae.

=== Scale factors ===
In an orthogonal coordinate system the lengths of the basis vectors are known as scale factors. The scale factors for the elliptic coordinates $(\mu, \nu)$ are equal to

$$h_{\mu} = h_{\nu} = a\sqrt{\sinh^{2}\mu + \sin^{2}\nu} = a\sqrt{\cosh^{2}\mu - \cos^{2}\nu}.$$

Using the double argument identities for hyperbolic functions and trigonometric functions, the scale factors can be equivalently expressed as

$$h_{\mu} = h_{\nu} = a\sqrt{\frac{1}{2} (\cosh2\mu - \cos2\nu)}.$$

Consequently, an infinitesimal element of area equals

$$\begin{align}
dA &= h_{\mu} h_{\nu}  d\mu d\nu \\
&= a^{2} \left( \sinh^{2}\mu + \sin^{2}\nu \right) d\mu d\nu \\
&= a^{2} \left( \cosh^{2}\mu - \cos^{2}\nu \right) d\mu d\nu \\
&= \frac{a^{2}}{2} \left( \cosh 2 \mu - \cos 2\nu \right) d\mu d\nu
\end{align}$$

and the Laplacian reads

$$\begin{align}
\nabla^{2} \Phi &= \frac{1}{a^{2} \left( \sinh^{2}\mu + \sin^{2}\nu \right)} \left( \frac{\partial^{2} \Phi}{\partial \mu^{2}} + \frac{\partial^{2} \Phi}{\partial \nu^{2}} \right) \\
&= \frac{1}{a^{2} \left( \cosh^{2}\mu - \cos^{2}\nu \right)} \left( \frac{\partial^{2} \Phi}{\partial \mu^{2}} + \frac{\partial^{2} \Phi}{\partial \nu^{2}} \right) \\
&= \frac{2}{a^{2} \left( \cosh 2 \mu - \cos 2 \nu \right)} \left( \frac{\partial^{2} \Phi}{\partial \mu^{2}} + \frac{\partial^{2} \Phi}{\partial \nu^{2}} \right)
\end{align}$$

Other differential operators such as $\nabla \cdot \mathbf{F}$ and $\nabla \times \mathbf{F}$ can be expressed in the coordinates $(\mu, \nu)$ by substituting the scale factors into the general formulae found in orthogonal coordinates.

== Alternative definition ==
An alternative and geometrically intuitive set of elliptic coordinates $(\sigma, \tau)$ are sometimes used, where $\sigma = \cosh \mu$ and $\tau = \cos \nu$. Hence, the curves of constant $\sigma$ are ellipses, whereas the curves of constant $\tau$ are hyperbolae. The coordinate $\tau$ must belong to the interval [-1, 1], whereas the $\sigma$ coordinate must be greater than or equal to one.

The coordinates $(\sigma, \tau)$ have a simple relation to the distances to the foci $F_{1}$ and $F_{2}$. For any point in the plane, the sum $d_{1}+d_{2}$ of its distances to the foci equals $2a\sigma$, whereas their difference $d_{1}-d_{2}$ equals $2a\tau$. Thus, the distance to $F_{1}$ is $a(\sigma+\tau)$, whereas the distance to $F_{2}$ is $a(\sigma-\tau)$. (Recall that $F_{1}$ and $F_{2}$ are located at $x=-a$ and $x=+a$, respectively.)

A drawback of these coordinates is that the points with Cartesian coordinates (x,y) and (x,-y) have the same coordinates $(\sigma, \tau)$, so the conversion to Cartesian coordinates is not a function, but a multifunction.

$$x = a \left. \sigma \right. \tau$$

$$y^{2} = a^{2} \left( \sigma^{2} - 1 \right) \left(1 - \tau^{2} \right).$$

=== Alternative scale factors ===
The scale factors for the alternative elliptic coordinates $(\sigma, \tau)$ are

$$h_{\sigma} = a\sqrt{\frac{\sigma^{2} - \tau^{2}}{\sigma^{2} - 1}}$$

$$h_{\tau} = a\sqrt{\frac{\sigma^{2} - \tau^{2}}{1 - \tau^{2}}}.$$

Hence, the infinitesimal area element becomes

$$dA = a^{2} \frac{\sigma^{2} - \tau^{2}}{\sqrt{\left( \sigma^{2} - 1 \right) \left( 1 - \tau^{2} \right)}} d\sigma d\tau$$

and the Laplacian equals

$$\nabla^{2} \Phi =
\frac{1}{a^{2} \left( \sigma^{2} - \tau^{2} \right) }
\left[
\sqrt{\sigma^{2} - 1} \frac{\partial}{\partial \sigma}
\left( \sqrt{\sigma^{2} - 1} \frac{\partial \Phi}{\partial \sigma} \right) +
\sqrt{1 - \tau^{2}} \frac{\partial}{\partial \tau}
\left( \sqrt{1 - \tau^{2}} \frac{\partial \Phi}{\partial \tau} \right)
\right].$$

Other differential operators such as $\nabla \cdot \mathbf{F}$ and $\nabla \times \mathbf{F}$ can be expressed in the coordinates $(\sigma, \tau)$ by substituting the scale factors into the general formulae found in orthogonal coordinates.

== Extrapolation to higher dimensions ==
Elliptic coordinates form the basis for several sets of three-dimensional orthogonal coordinates:

1. The elliptic cylindrical coordinates are produced by projecting in the $z$-direction.
2. The prolate spheroidal coordinates are produced by rotating the elliptic coordinates about the $x$-axis, i.e., the axis connecting the foci, whereas the oblate spheroidal coordinates are produced by rotating the elliptic coordinates about the $y$-axis, i.e., the axis separating the foci.
3. Ellipsoidal coordinates are a formal extension of elliptic coordinates into 3-dimensions, which is based on confocal ellipsoids, hyperboloids of one and two sheets.

Note that (ellipsoidal) Geographic coordinate system is a different concept from above.

== Applications ==
The classic applications of elliptic coordinates are in solving partial differential equations, e.g., Laplace's equation or the Helmholtz equation, for which elliptic coordinates are a natural description of a system thus allowing a separation of variables in the partial differential equations. Some traditional examples are solving systems such as electrons orbiting a molecule or planetary orbits that have an elliptical shape.

The geometric properties of elliptic coordinates can also be useful. A typical example might involve an integration over all pairs of vectors $\mathbf{p}$ and $\mathbf{q}$ that sum to a fixed vector $\mathbf{r} = \mathbf{p} + \mathbf{q}$, where the integrand was a function of the vector lengths $\left| \mathbf{p} \right|$ and $\left| \mathbf{q} \right|$. (In such a case, one would position $\mathbf{r}$ between the two foci and aligned with the $x$-axis, i.e., $\mathbf{r} = 2a \mathbf{\hat{x}}$.) For concreteness, $\mathbf{r}$, $\mathbf{p}$ and $\mathbf{q}$ could represent the momenta of a particle and its decomposition products, respectively, and the integrand might involve the kinetic energies of the products (which are proportional to the squared lengths of the momenta).

== See also ==
- Curvilinear coordinates
- Ellipsoidal coordinates
- Generalized coordinates
- Bipolar coordinates
