= Spheroidal wave function =

Solutions of the Helmholtz equation

Spheroidal wave functions are solutions of the Helmholtz equation that are found by writing the equation in spheroidal coordinates and applying the technique of separation of variables, just like the use of spherical coordinates lead to spherical harmonics. They are called oblate spheroidal wave functions if oblate spheroidal coordinates are used and prolate spheroidal wave functions if prolate spheroidal coordinates are used. If instead of the Helmholtz equation, the Laplace equation is solved in spheroidal coordinates using the method of separation of variables, the spheroidal wave functions reduce to the spheroidal harmonics. With oblate spheroidal coordinates, the solutions are called oblate harmonics and with prolate spheroidal coordinates, prolate harmonics. Both type of spheroidal harmonics are expressible in terms of Legendre functions.

== See also ==
- Oblate spheroidal coordinates, especially the section Oblate spheroidal harmonics, for a more extensive discussion.
- Oblate spheroidal wave function
