= Rotational diffusion =

Mechanics concept

A molecule with a red cross on its front undergoing 3 dimensional rotational diffusion. The red cross moves erratically as the sphere is made to randomly rotate by collisions with surrounding molecules.

Rotational diffusion is the rotational movement which acts upon any object such as particles, molecules, atoms when present in a fluid, by random changes in their orientations. Although the directions and intensities of these changes are statistically random, they do not arise randomly and are instead the result of interactions between particles. One example occurs in colloids, where relatively large insoluble particles are suspended in a greater amount of fluid. The changes in orientation occur from collisions between the particle and the many molecules forming the fluid surrounding the particle, which each transfer kinetic energy to the particle, and as such can be considered random due to the varied speeds and amounts of fluid molecules incident on each individual particle at any given time.

The analogue to translational diffusion which determines the particle's position in space, rotational diffusion randomises the orientation of any particle it acts on. Anything in a solution will experience rotational diffusion, from the microscopic scale where individual atoms may have an effect on each other, to the macroscopic scale.

== Applications ==
Rotational diffusion has multiple applications in chemistry and physics, and is heavily involved in many biology based fields. For example, protein-protein interaction is a vital step in the communication of biological signals. In order to communicate, the proteins must both come into contact with each other and be facing the appropriate way to interact with each other's binding site, which relies on the proteins ability to rotate. As an example concerning physics, rotational Brownian motion in astronomy can be used to explain the orientations of the orbital planes of binary stars, as well as the seemingly random spin axes of supermassive black holes.

The random re-orientation of molecules (or larger systems) is an important process for many biophysical probes. Due to the equipartition theorem, larger molecules re-orient more slowly than do smaller objects and, hence, measurements of the rotational diffusion constants can give insight into the overall mass and its distribution within an object. Quantitatively, the mean square of the angular velocity about each of an object's principal axes is inversely proportional to its moment of inertia about that axis. Therefore, there should be three rotational diffusion constants - the eigenvalues of the rotational diffusion tensor - resulting in five rotational time constants. If two eigenvalues of the diffusion tensor are equal, the particle diffuses as a spheroid with two unique diffusion rates and three time constants. And if all eigenvalues are the same, the particle diffuses as a sphere with one time constant. The diffusion tensor may be determined from the Perrin friction factors, in analogy with the Einstein relation of translational diffusion, but often is inaccurate and direct measurement is required.

The rotational diffusion tensor may be determined experimentally through fluorescence anisotropy, flow birefringence, dielectric spectroscopy, NMR relaxation and other biophysical methods sensitive to picosecond or slower rotational processes. In some techniques such as fluorescence it may be very difficult to characterize the full diffusion tensor, for example measuring two diffusion rates can sometimes be possible when there is a great difference between them, e.g., for very long, thin ellipsoids such as certain viruses. This is however not the case of the extremely sensitive, atomic resolution technique of NMR relaxation that can be used to fully determine the rotational diffusion tensor to very high precision. Rotational diffusion of macromolecules in complex biological fluids (i.e., cytoplasm) is slow enough to be measurable by techniques with microsecond time resolution, i.e. fluorescence correlation spectroscopy.

== The diffusion equation and the rotational diffusion constant ==
To model the diffusion process, consider a large number of identical rotating particles. The orientation of each particle is described by a unit vector $\hat{n}$; for example, $\hat{n}$ might represent the orientation of an electric or magnetic dipole moment. Let f(θ, φ, t) represent the probability density distribution for the orientation of $\hat{n}$ at time t. Here, θ and φ represent the spherical angles, with θ being the polar angle between $\hat{n}$ and the z-axis and φ being the azimuthal angle of $\hat{n}$ in the x-y plane.

Fick's second law of diffusion, applied to angular diffusion, states that in the absence of an external torque on the particles, the evolution of f(θ, φ, t) obeys

$$\frac{1}{D_{\mathrm{rot}}} \frac{\partial f}{\partial t} = \nabla^{2}_{\theta\phi} f.$$

Here $D_\mathrm{rot}$ is the angular diffusion coefficient, whose units are rad^{2}/s. (Note: This version of the angular diffusion equation assumes spherical symmetry. In a non-symmetric situation, a tensor analog applies.)

This equation contains the angular Laplace operator $\nabla^{2}_{\theta\phi}$, which can be written

$$\nabla^{2}_{\theta\phi}f = \frac{1}{\sin\theta} \frac{\partial}{\partial \theta}\left( \sin\theta \frac{\partial f}{\partial \theta} \right) +
\frac{1}{\sin^{2} \theta} \frac{\partial^{2} f}{\partial \phi^{2}}.$$

=== Solution of the diffusion equation ===
This partial differential equation may be solved using the method of separation of variables by expanding $f(\theta, \phi, t)$ in spherical harmonics $Y^{m}_{l}(\theta,\phi).$

Since spherical harmonics satisfy the identity

$$\nabla^{2}_{\theta\phi} Y^{m}_{l}(\theta,\phi) = -l(l+1) Y^{m}_{l}(\theta,\phi),$$.

the solution may be written

$$f(\theta, \phi, t) = \sum_{l=0}^{\infty} \sum_{m=-l}^{l} C_{lm} Y^{m}_{l}(\theta, \phi) e^{-t/\tau_{l}}$$,

where C_{lm} are constants (which depend on the initial distribution $f(\theta, \phi, 0)$) and the time constants are

$$\tau_{l} = \frac{1}{D_{\mathrm{rot}}l(l+1)}$$.

== Two-dimensional rotational diffusion ==
A sphere rotating around a fixed central axis can be modelled as a circle rotating in 2-dimensions when viewed from the axis of rotation. Here A_{0} is the starting position at t_{0} and A is the position at time t when the circle has rotated by θ.

A sphere rotating around a fixed axis will rotate in two dimensions only and can be viewed from above the fixed axis as a circle. In this example, a sphere which is fixed on the vertical axis rotates around that axis only, meaning that the particle can have a θ value of 0 through 360 degrees, or 2π Radians, before having a net rotation of 0 again.

These directions can be placed onto a graph which covers the entirety of the possible positions for the face to be at relative to the starting point, through 2π radians, starting with -π radians through 0 to π radians. Assuming all particles begin with single orientation of 0, the first measurement of directions taken will resemble a delta function at 0 as all particles will be at their starting, or 0th, position and therefore create an infinitely steep single line. Over time, the increasing amount of measurements taken will cause a spread in results; the initial measurements will see a thin peak form on the graph as the particle can only move slightly in a short time. Then as more time passes, the chance for the molecule to rotate further from its starting point increases which widens the peak, until enough time has passed that the measurements will be evenly distributed across all possible directions.

The distribution of orientations will reach a point where they become uniform as they all randomly disperse to be nearly equal in all directions. This can be visualized in two ways.

1. For a single particle with multiple measurements taken over time. A particle which has an area designated as its face pointing in the starting orientation, starting at a time t_{0} will begin with an orientation distribution resembling a single line as it is the only measurement. Each successive measurement at time greater than t_{0} will widen the peak as the particle will have had more time to rotate away from the starting position.
2. For multiple particles measured once long after the first measurement. The same case can be made with a large number of molecules, all starting at their respective 0th orientation. Assuming enough time has passed to be much greater than t_{0}, the molecules may have fully rotated if the forces acting on them require, and a single measurement shows they are near-to-evenly distributed.

=== Basic equations ===
For rotational diffusion about a single axis, the mean-square angular deviation in time $t$ is

$$\left\langle\theta^2\right\rangle = 2 D_r t$$,

where $D_r$ is the rotational diffusion coefficient (whose units are radians^{2}/s). The angular drift velocity $\Omega_d = (d\theta/dt)_{\rm drift}$ in response to an external torque $\Gamma_{\theta}$ (assuming that the flow stays non-turbulent and that inertial effects can be neglected) is given by

$$\Omega_d = \frac{\Gamma_\theta}{f_r}$$,

where $f_r$ is the frictional drag coefficient. The relationship between the rotational diffusion coefficient and the rotational frictional drag coefficient is given by the Einstein relation (or Einstein–Smoluchowski relation):

$$D_r = \frac{k_{\rm B} T}{f_r}$$,

where $k_{\rm B}$ is the Boltzmann constant and $T$ is the absolute temperature. These relationships are in complete analogy to translational diffusion.

The rotational frictional drag coefficient for a sphere of radius $R$ is

$$f_{r, \textrm{sphere}} = 8 \pi \eta R^3$$

where $\eta$ is the dynamic (or shear) viscosity.

The rotational diffusion of spheres, such as nanoparticles, may deviate from what is expected when in complex environments, such as in polymer solutions or gels. This deviation can be explained by the formation of a depletion layer around the nanoparticle.

=== Langevin dynamics ===
Collisions with the surrounding fluid molecules will create a fluctuating torque on the sphere due to the varied speeds, numbers, and directions of impact. When trying to rotate a sphere via an externally applied torque, there will be a systematic drag resistance to rotation. With these two facts combined, it is possible to write the Langevin-like equation:

$\frac{dL}{dt} = {I}\, \cdot \frac{d^2{\theta}}{dt^2} = - {\zeta}^{r} \cdot \frac{d{\theta}}{dt} + TB(t)$

Where:

- L is the angular momentum.
- $\frac{dL}{dt}$ is torque.
- I is the moment of inertia about the rotation axis.
- t is the time.
- t_{0} is the start time.
- θ is the angle between the orientation at t_{0} and any time after, t.
- ζ^{r} is the rotational friction coefficient.
- TB(t) is the fluctuating Brownian torque at time t.

The overall Torque on the particle will be the difference between:

$TB(t)$ and $({\zeta}^{r} \cdot \frac{d{\theta}}{dt})$.

This equation is the rotational version of Newtons second equation of motion. For example, in standard translational terms, a rocket will experience a boosting force from the engine while simultaneously experiencing a resistive force from the air it is travelling through. The same can be said for an object which is rotating.

Due to the random nature of rotation of the particle, the average Brownian torque is equal in both directions of rotation. symbolised as:

$\left \langle TB(t) \right \rangle = 0$

This means the equation can be averaged to get:

$\frac{d \left \langle L \right \rangle}{dt} = - {\zeta}^{r} \cdot \left \langle \frac{d{\theta}}{dt} \right \rangle = -\frac{\zeta^r}{I} \left \langle L \right \rangle$

Which is to say that the first derivative with respect to time of the average Angular momentum is equal to the negative of the Rotational friction coefficient divided by the moment of inertia, all multiplied by the average of the angular momentum.

As $\frac{d \left \langle L \right \rangle}{dt}$ is the rate of change of angular momentum over time, and is equal to a negative value of a coefficient multiplied by $\left \langle L \right \rangle$, this shows that the angular momentum is decreasing over time, or decaying with a decay time of:

${\tau{_L}} = \frac{I}{\zeta^r}$.

For a sphere of mass m, uniform density ρ and radius a, the moment of inertia is:

$I = \frac{2ma^2}{5} = \frac{8{\pi}{\rho}a^5}{15}$.

As mentioned above, the rotational drag is given by the Stokes friction for rotation:

${\zeta^r} = 8\pi\eta a^3$

Combining all of the equations and formula from above, we get:

${\tau{_L}} = \frac{\rho a^2}{15\eta} = \frac{3}{10}\tau_p$ where:

- $\tau_p$ is the momentum relaxation time
- η is the viscosity of the Liquid the sphere is in.

=== Example: Spherical particle in water ===
Water particles (blue) and larger virus particle (red). The impact between the virus and water molecules will cause translational and rotational movement with varying speeds depending on the angle and speed of impact.

Let's say there is a virus which can be modelled as a perfect sphere with the following conditions:

- Radius (a) of 100 nanometres, a = 10^{−7}m.
- Density: ρ = 1500 kg m^{−3}
- Orientation originally facing in a direction denoted by π.
- Suspended in water.
- Water has a viscosity of η = 8.9 × 10^{−4} Pa·s at 25 °C
- Assume uniform mass and density throughout the particle

First, the mass of the virus particle can be calculated:

$m = \frac {4\rho\pi a^{3}} {3} = \frac {4 \times 1500 \times \pi \times (10^{-7})^3} {3} = 6.3 \times 10^{-18} \mathrm{kg}$

From this, we now know all the variables to calculate moment of inertia:

$I = \frac {2ma^{2}} {5} = \frac {2 \times (6.3\times10^{-18}) \times (10^{-7})^2} {5} = 2.5 \times 10^{-32} \mathrm{kg} \cdot \mathrm{m}^2$

Simultaneous to this, we can also calculate the rotational drag:

$\zeta^{r} = 8 \pi \eta a^{3} = 8 \times \pi \times (8.9\times10^{-4}) \times (10^{-7})^3 = 2.237 \times 10^{-23} \mathrm{Pa} \cdot \mathrm{s} \cdot \mathrm{m}^3$

Combining these equations we get:

$\tau_L = \frac {I} {\zeta^r} = \frac {2.5 \times 10^{-32} \mathrm{kg} \cdot \mathrm{m}^2} {2.2 \times 10^{-23} \mathrm{Pa} \cdot \mathrm{s} \cdot \mathrm{m}^3} = 1.1 \times 10^{-9} \mathrm{kg} \cdot \mathrm{Pa}^{-1} \cdot \mathrm{s}^{-1} \cdot \mathrm{m}^{-1}$

As the SI units for Pascal are kg⋅m^{−1}⋅s^{−2} the units in the answer can be reduced to read:

$\tau_L = 1.1 \times 10^{-9} \mathrm{s}$

For this example, the decay time of the virus is in the order of nanoseconds.

== Smoluchowski description of rotation ==
To write the Smoluchowski equation for a particle rotating in two dimensions, we introduce a probability density P(θ, t) to find the vector u at an angle θ and time t. This can be done by writing a continuity equation:

${\partial P(\theta,t)\over\partial t} = - {\partial j(\theta,t)\over\partial \theta}$

where the current can be written as:

$j(\theta,t) = - D^r {\partial P(\theta,t)\over\partial \theta}$

Which can be combined to give the rotational diffusion equation:

${\partial P(\theta,t)\over\partial t} = D^r {\partial^2 P(\theta,t)\over\partial \theta^2} = D^rP(\theta,t)$

We can express the current in terms of an angular velocity which is a result of Brownian torque T_{B} through a rotational mobility with the equation:

$j_B(\theta,t) = \dot{\theta}_B P(\theta,t)$

Where:

- $\dot{\theta}_B = \mu^rT_B$
- $T_B = - {\partial V_B \over \partial \theta}$
- $V_B(\theta,t) = k_BT \ln P(\theta,t)$

The only difference between rotational and translational diffusion in this case is that in the rotational diffusion, we have periodicity in the angle θ. As the particle is modelled as a sphere rotating in two dimensions, the space the particle can take is compact and finite, as the particle can rotate a distance of 2π before returning to its original position

$P(\theta + 2\pi , t ) = {P(\theta,t)}$

We can create a conditional probability density, which is the probability of finding the vector u at the angle θ and time t given that it was at angle θ_{0} at time t=0 This is written as such:

$P(\theta,0 \mid \theta_0) = \delta (\theta - \theta_0)$

The solution to this equation can be found through a Fourier series:

$P(\theta,t\mid\theta_0) = \frac {1} {2\pi} \left [1+ 2\sum_{m=1}^\infty e^{-D^rm^2t}\cos m(\theta - \theta_0) \right ] = \frac{1}{2\pi} \Theta_3 (\frac {1}{2} (\theta - \theta_0), e^{-D^rt})$

Where $\Theta_3(z,\tau)$ is the Jacobian theta function of the third kind.

By using the equation

$\Theta_3(z,\tau) = (-i\tau)^{-1/2}\exp\biggl(\frac{z^2}{i\pi\tau}\biggl) \Theta_3 \biggl(\frac{z}{\tau}, - \frac{1}{\tau}\biggl)$

The conditional probability density function can be written as :

$P(\theta,t \mid \theta_0) = \frac {1}{\sqrt{4\pi D^rt}} \sum_{n=-\infty}^\infty \exp \left [- \frac{(\theta-\theta_0-2n\pi)^2}{4D^rt} \right ]$

For short times after the starting point where t ≈ t_{0} and θ ≈ θ_{0}, the formula becomes:

$P(\theta,t \mid \theta_0) \approx \frac {1}{\sqrt{4\pi D^rt}} \exp \left [ - \frac{(\theta-\theta_0)^2} {4D^rt} \right ] + \cdots$

The terms included in these are exponentially small and make little enough difference to not be included here. This means that at short times the conditional probability looks similar to translational diffusion, as both show extremely small perturbations near t_{0}. However at long times, t » t_{0} , the behaviour of rotational diffusion is different to translational diffusion:

$P(\theta,t \mid \theta_0) \approx \frac{1}{2\pi}, t \rightarrow \infty$

The main difference between rotational diffusion and translational diffusion is that rotational diffusion has a periodicity of $\theta + (2 \pi) = \theta$, meaning that these two angles are identical. This is because a circle can rotate entirely once before being at the same angle as it was in the beginning, meaning that all the possible orientations can be mapped within the space of $2 \pi$. This is opposed to translational diffusion, which has no such periodicity.

The conditional probability of having the angle be θ is approximately $\frac {1}{2\pi}$ .

This is because over long periods of time, the particle has had time rotate throughout the entire range of angles possible and as such, the angle θ could be any amount between θ_{0} and θ_{0} + 2 π. The probability is near-evenly distributed through each angle as at large enough times. This can be proven through summing the probability of all possible angles. As there are 2π possible angles, each with the probability of $\frac {1}{2\pi}$ , the total probability sums to 1, which means there is a certainty of finding the angle at some point on the circle.

== See also ==
- Diffusion equation
- Perrin friction factors
- Rotational correlation time
- False diffusion
