= Reduced viscosity =

In fluid dynamics, the reduced viscosity of a polymer is the ratio of the relative viscosity increment ($\eta_i$) to the mass concentration of the species of interest (c). It has units of volume per unit mass.

The reduced viscosity is given by

$$\frac{\eta_i}{c},$$

where $\eta_i$ is the relative viscosity increment given by $\eta_i = \frac{\eta - \eta_s}{\eta_s}$ (Where $\eta_s$ is the viscosity of the solvent.)

== See also ==
- Huggins equation
- Intrinsic viscosity
- Mark–Houwink equation
- Relative viscosity
- Viscosity
