= Ubbelohde =

Ubbelohde may refer to:

== People ==
- Alfred Ubbelohde (1907–1988), Belgian-born English chemist
- Leo Ubbelohde (1877–1964), German chemist
- Otto Ubbelohde (1867–1922), German painter

== Other ==
- Ubbelohde viscometer, laboratory measuring instrument
