= Super-resolution dipole orientation mapping =

Super-resolution dipole orientation mapping (SDOM) is a form of fluorescence polarization microscopy (FPM) that achieved super resolution through polarization demodulation. It was first described by Karl Zhanghao and others in 2016. Fluorescence polarization (FP) is related to the dipole orientation of chromophores, making fluorescence polarization microscopy possible to reveal structures and functions of tagged cellular organelles and biological macromolecules. In addition to fluorescence intensity, wavelength, and lifetime, the fourth dimension of fluorescence—polarization—can also provide intensity modulation without the restriction to specific fluorophores; its investigation in super-resolution microscopy is still in its infancy.

== History ==
In 2013, Hafi et al. developed a novel super-resolution technique through sparse deconvolution of polarization-modulated fluorescent images (SPoD). Because the fluorescent dipole is an inherent feature of fluorescence, and its polarization intensity can be easily modulated with rotating linear polarized excitation, the polarization-based super-resolution technique therefore holds great promise with regard to a wide range of biological applications due to its compatibility with conventional fluorescent specimen labeling. The SPoD data, consisting of sequences of diffraction-limited images illuminated with varying linearly polarized light, were reconstructed with a deconvolution algorithm termed SPEED (sparsity penalty – enhanced estimation by demodulation). Although super resolution can be achieved, the dipole orientation information is lost during SPoD reconstruction.

In 2016, Keller et al. argue that the improvement in resolution observed with the SPoD method is a deconvolution effect. That is, the super-resolution in the images that Hafi shows is achieved by SPEED algorithm not the SPoD method. So the polarization information does not contribute substantially to the final image. They concluded that polarization can't add further super-resolution information.

At the same time, Waller et al. replied to the debate and they admit the question raised by Keller. They did some new experiments to support SPoD could bring further information. They prove that raw modulation information in SPoD also separated sub-diffractional details without SPEED. However, whether it works for heterogeneously and densely labeled samples is unsure and still need further studies.

Afterwards, Karl Zhanghao et al. proposed a new approach called SDOM that resolves the effective dipole orientation from a much smaller number of fluorescent molecules within a sub-diffraction focal area. They also applied this method to resolve structural details in both fixed and live cells. Their results showed that polarization does provide further structural information on top of the super-resolution image, thereby providing a timely answer to the key question raised by the debate mentioned above.

== Fluorescence polarization microscopy ==
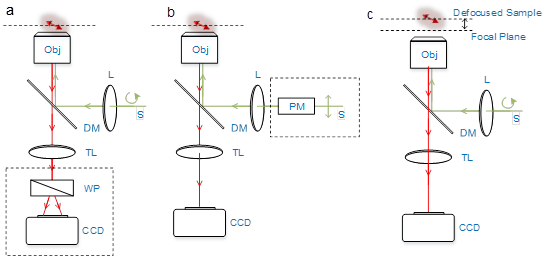
Schematic setup of different types of FPM.

As a fundamental physical dimension of fluorescence, polarization has been applied extensively in biological research. Through fluorescence polarization microscopy (FPM), the dipole orientation as well as the intensity of fluorescent probes could be measured. Compared with X-ray crystallography or electron microscopy which could elucidate ultra-high resolution of individual proteins or macromolecule assemblies, FPM doesn't require complex sample preparation which makes it suitable for live cell imaging. Near-field imaging techniques, such as Atomic Force Microscopy (AFM) could also provide structural information, which however, is limited only to samples on the surface. FPM is capable of imaging orientations in dynamic samples at the time scale of seconds or milliseconds, thus it can serve as a complementary method for the measurement of subcellular organelle structures.

FPM has been evolving over the past decades, from manual or mechanical switching of polarization detection or excitation to simultaneously detection and fast polarization modulation via electro-optic devices. With faster imaging speed and higher imaging quality, FPM has been incorporated with various imaging modalities, such as wide-field, confocal microscopy, two-photon confocal, total internal reflection fluorescence microscope, FRAP, etc. However, as an optical imaging technique, the development of fluorescence polarization microscopy (FPM) is barricaded by the diffraction limit. Compared to the abundant super-resolution techniques on fluorescence intensity imaging, super-resolution techniques in FPM are still in its infancy.

Recently, three forms of FPM have emerged and it has been proved that they can achieve super-resolution. They are SPoD, SDOM and polar-dSTORM (polarization-resolved direct stochastic optical reconstruction microscopy).

Polar-dSTORM used On-Off modulation of the fluorescent probes and acquired adequate frames for a reconstruction of super resolution image. The imaging resolution of polar-dSTORM is high, with localization precision in tens of nanometers. Single dipole average orientation is directly measured separately and the wobbling angle is statistically calculated from neighboring emitters. The drawback of polar-dSTORM is a long imaging time of 2–40 min, which requires a stationary sample during the imaging period. The sample preparation of dSTORM also makes it hard for live cell samples.

SDOM has achieved super resolution dipole orientation mapping with a spatial resolution of 150 nm and sub-second temporal resolution. It has been applied to both fixed cell and live cell imaging, which shows great advantages over diffraction limited FPM techniques on both revealing sub-diffractional structures and measuring local dipole orientations. In comparison with polar-dSTROM, SDOM still measures average dipoles and could not separate the signal of the wobbling of single fluorophores from the variation of orientation distribution of fluorophores with the resolvable area. As with SPoD, the power of SDOM would be weakened if the fluorescent probes are distributed too homogeneously or too dense.

Thanks to the intrinsic polarization of chromophores, fluorescence polarization reveals the structures and functions of the biological macromolecules. With incorporation with various optical imaging modalities, FPM has played an irreplaceable role in solving many questions. Fast and non-invasive imaging of the samples makes it a complementary tool for X-crystallography which typically applies to individual proteins, or sub-complexes, or EM which requires invasive sample preparation, or AFM which could measure the surface of the sample. Compared to these methods, the specific labeling of the fluorescent probes provides better focus on the structure of interest.

As the development of FPM techniques, its power has spread from uniform oriented fluorophores to fluorescent dipoles with organized orientation or on complex bio-structures. The detection accuracy has improved from measuring the bulk volume polarization to sub-diffraction area measurement and single dipole measurement. Imaging resolution of FPM matters not only for intensity image but also for the accuracy of dipole orientation detection. Recently developed super resolution FPM techniques still have their limitations though demonstrating great successes in their imaging results. Spatial 3D super resolution FPM techniques and 3D orientation measurement of fluorescent dipoles are still missing. In the future, more inventions are anticipated which could achieve both high-resolution measurement and fast temporal resolution, allowing imaging samples of live cells. This may be done by introducing existing super resolution principles into FPM, or by better exploiting the intensity fluctuation with polarization modulation, or other alternative means.

== Principle of SDOM ==
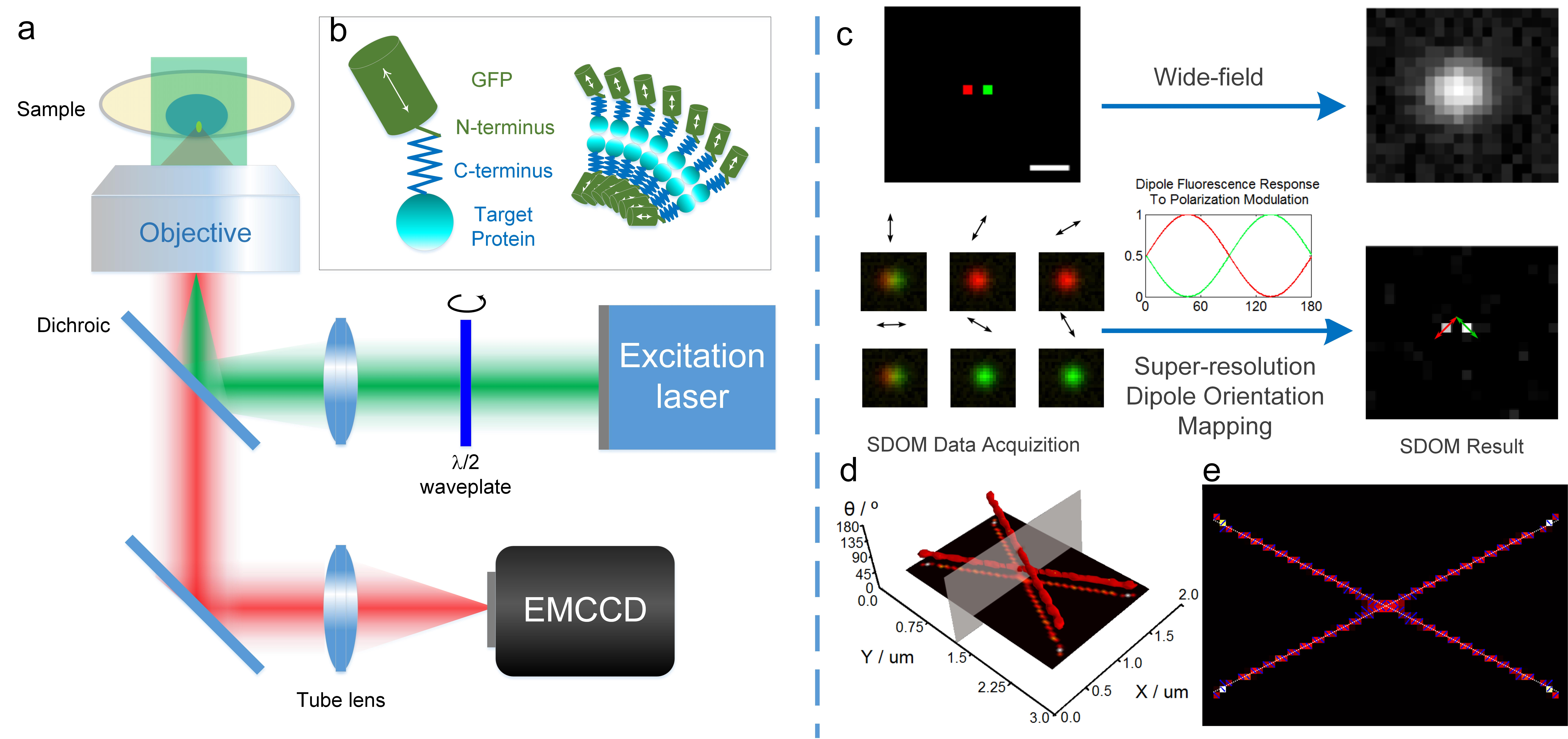
Schematic diagram of SDOM.

Unlike other super-resolution methods, such as STED, SIM, PLAM and STORM, SDOM can achieve super-resolution based on a wide-field epi-fluorescence illumination microscope. The key point of SDOM is polarized excitation. The SDOM imaging system can be seen in figure A. The rotary linear polarized excitation is realized by continuously rotating a half-wave plate in front of a laser. Then, the illumination beam is focused onto the back focal plane of the objective to generate uniform illumination with rotating polarization light. The series of fluorescence images excited from different angles of polarized excitation are collected by an EMCCD camera.

All organic fluorescent dyes and fluorescent proteins are dipoles, whose orientations are closely related to the structure of their labeled target proteins. Because both the excitation absorption and fluorescence emission of dipoles have polarization features, FPM has been widely used to study dipole orientation. As illustrated in the inset schematic figure B, the fluorophores (such as GFP) are linked to the target protein via the C terminus (connected to GFP's N terminus), and the dipole angle of the fluorophore will reflect the orientation of the target protein. Therefore, the SDOM can be used to study the structure of the protein.

Figure C illustrates the principle of the SDOM super-resolution technique. Two neighboring fluorophores with 100 nm distance and different dipole orientations (pseudocolor in red and green) emit periodic signals excited by rotating polarized light. By rotating the polarization of excitation, the emission ratio between the two molecules is modulated accordingly, resulting in their separation in the polarization domain. The sparsity deconvolution can achieve a super-resolution image of effective dipole intensities under polarization modulation; with least-squares fitting, the dipole orientation can be determined. Arrows indicate the directions of dipole orientations. The super-resolution was achieved in the polarization domain.

The SDOM result of two intersecting lines is shown in figure D, with arrows on top of the super-resolution image, illustrating the dipole orientation. Figure E shows the corresponding data are represented in (X, Y, θ) coordinates, in which the XY plane is the super-resolved intensity image. From both D and E, we can see that as SDOM introduces a new dimension, the molecules that are not able to be resolved in the super-resolution intensity image can be completely separated in the dipole orientation domain.
