= Oblate spheroidal wave function =

Special type of functions in mathematics

In applied mathematics, oblate spheroidal wave functions (like also prolate spheroidal wave functions and other related functions) are involved in the solution of the Helmholtz equation in oblate spheroidal coordinates. When solving this equation, $\Delta \Phi + k^2 \Phi=0$, by the method of separation of variables, $(\xi,\eta,\varphi)$, with:

$$\ z=(d/2) \xi \eta,$$

$$\ x=(d/2) \sqrt{(\xi^2+1)(1-\eta^2)} \cos \varphi,$$

$$\ y=(d/2) \sqrt{(\xi^2+1)(1-\eta^2)} \sin \varphi,$$

$$\ \xi \ge 0 \text{ and } |\eta| \le 1.$$

the solution $\Phi(\xi,\eta,\varphi)$ can be written as the product of a radial spheroidal wave function $R_{mn}(-i c,i \xi)$ and an angular spheroidal wave function $S_{mn}(-i c,\eta)$ by $e^{i m \varphi}$. Here $c=kd/2$, with $d$ being the interfocal length of the elliptical cross section of the oblate spheroid.

The radial wave function $R_{mn}(-i c,i \xi)$ satisfies the linear ordinary differential equation:

$$\ (\xi^2 +1) \frac{d^2  R_{mn}(-i c,i \xi)}{d \xi ^2} + 2\xi \frac{d  R_{mn}(-i c,i \xi)}{d \xi} -\left(\lambda_{mn}(c) -c^2 \xi^2 -\frac{m^2}{\xi^2+1}\right) {R_{mn}(-i c,i \xi)} = 0$$.

The angular wave function satisfies the differential equation:

$$\ (1- \eta^2) \frac{d^2  S_{mn}(-i c,\eta)}{d \eta ^2} - 2\eta \frac{d  S_{mn}(-i c,\eta)}{d \eta} +\left(\lambda_{mn}(c) +c^2 \eta^2 -\frac{m^2}{1- \eta^2}\right) {S_{mn}(-i c,\eta)} = 0$$.

It is the same differential equation as in the case of the radial wave function. However, the range of the radial coordinate $\xi$ is different from that of the angular coordinate $\eta$.

The eigenvalue $\lambda_{mn}(-ic)$ of this Sturm–Liouville problem is fixed by the requirement that ${S_{mn}(-ic,\eta)}$ be finite for $|\eta| = 1$.

For $c=0$ these two differential equations reduce to the equations satisfied by the associated Legendre polynomials. For $c\ne 0$, the angular spheroidal wave functions can be expanded as a series of Legendre functions. Such expansions have been considered by Müller.

The differential equations given above for the oblate radial and angular wave functions can be obtained from the corresponding equations for the prolate spheroidal wave functions by the substitution of $-ic$ for $c$ and $i \xi$ for $\xi$. The notation for the oblate spheroidal functions reflects this relationship.

There are different normalization schemes for spheroidal functions. A table of the different schemes can be found in Abramowitz and Stegun. Abramowitz and Stegun (and the present article) follow the notation of Flammer.

Originally, the spheroidal wave functions were introduced by C. Niven, which lead to a Helmholtz equation in spheroidal coordinates. Monographs tying together many aspects of the theory of spheroidal wave functions were written by Strutt, Stratton et al., Meixner and Schafke, and Flammer.

Flammer provided a thorough discussion of the calculation of the eigenvalues, angular wavefunctions, and radial wavefunctions for both the oblate and the prolate case. Computer programs for this purpose have been developed by many, including Van Buren et al., King and Van Buren, Baier et al., Zhang and Jin, and Thompson. Van Buren has recently developed new methods for calculating oblate spheroidal wave functions that extend the ability to obtain numerical values to extremely wide parameter ranges. These results are based on earlier work on prolate spheroidal wave functions. Fortran source code that combines the new results with traditional methods is available at http://www.mathieuandspheroidalwavefunctions.com.

Tables of numerical values of oblate spheroidal wave functions are given in Flammer, Hanish et al., and Van Buren et al.

Asymptotic expansions of angular oblate spheroidal wave functions for large values of $c$ have been derived by Müller., also similarly for prolate spheroidal wave functions.

The Digital Library of Mathematical Functions http://dlmf.nist.gov provided by NIST is an excellent resource for spheroidal wave functions.
