= Intrinsic viscosity =

Measure of solute's contribution to viscosity

IUPAC definition

intrinsic viscosity: The limiting value of the reduced viscosity or the inherent viscosity at infinite dilution of the polymer.

Intrinsic viscosity $\left[ \eta \right]$ is a measure of a solute's contribution to the viscosity $\eta$ of a solution. If $\eta_0$ is the viscosity in the absence of the solute, $\eta$ is (dynamic or kinematic) viscosity of the solution and $\phi$ is the volume fraction of the solute in the solution, then intrinsic viscosity is defined as the dimensionless number
$$\left[ \eta \right] = \lim_{\phi \rightarrow 0} \frac{\eta - \eta_{0}}{\eta_{0}\phi}$$
It should not be confused with inherent viscosity, which is the ratio of the natural logarithm of the relative viscosity to the mass concentration of the polymer.

When the solute particles are rigid spheres at infinite dilution, the intrinsic viscosity equals $\frac{5}{2}$, as shown first by Albert Einstein.

In practical settings, $\phi$ is usually solute mass concentration (c, g/dL), and the units of intrinsic viscosity $\left[ \eta \right]$ are deciliters per gram (dL/g), otherwise known as inverse concentration.

== Formulae for rigid spheroids ==
Generalizing from spheres to spheroids with an axial semiaxis $a$ (i.e., the semiaxis of revolution) and equatorial semiaxes $b$, the intrinsic viscosity can be written

$$\left[ \eta \right] =
\left( \frac{4}{15} \right) (J + K - L) +
\left( \frac{2}{3} \right) L +
\left( \frac{1}{3} \right) M +
\left( \frac{1}{15} \right)  N$$

where the constants are defined

$$M \ \stackrel{\mathrm{def}}{=}\  \frac{1}{a b^{4}} \frac{1}{J_{\alpha}^{\prime}}$$

$$K \ \stackrel{\mathrm{def}}{=}\  \frac{M}{2}$$

$$J \ \stackrel{\mathrm{def}}{=}\  K \frac{J_{\alpha}^{\prime\prime}}{J_{\beta}^{\prime\prime}}$$

$$L \ \stackrel{\mathrm{def}}{=}\  \frac{2}{a b^{2} \left( a^{2} + b^{2} \right)}
\frac{1}{J_{\beta}^{\prime}}$$

$$N \ \stackrel{\mathrm{def}}{=}\  \frac{6}{a b^{2}}
\frac{\left( a^{2} - b^{2} \right)}{a^{2} J_{\alpha} + b^{2} J_{\beta}}$$

The $J$ coefficients are the Jeffery functions

$$J_{\alpha} =
\int_{0}^{\infty}  \frac{dx}{\left( x + b^{2} \right) \sqrt{\left( x + a^{2} \right)^{3}}}$$

$$J_{\beta} =
\int_{0}^{\infty}  \frac{dx}{\left( x + b^{2} \right)^{2} \sqrt{\left( x + a^{2} \right)}}$$

$$J_{\alpha}^{\prime} =
\int_{0}^{\infty}  \frac{dx}{\left( x + b^{2} \right)^{3} \sqrt{\left( x + a^{2} \right)}}$$

$$J_{\beta}^{\prime} =
\int_{0}^{\infty}  \frac{dx}{\left( x + b^{2} \right)^{2} \sqrt{\left( x + a^{2} \right)^{3}}}$$

$$J_{\alpha}^{\prime\prime} =
\int_{0}^{\infty}  \frac{x\ dx}{\left( x + b^{2} \right)^{3} \sqrt{\left( x + a^{2} \right)}}$$

$$J_{\beta}^{\prime\prime} =
\int_{0}^{\infty}  \frac{x\ dx}{\left( x + b^{2} \right)^{2} \sqrt{\left( x + a^{2} \right)^{3}}}$$

== General ellipsoidal formulae ==
It is possible to generalize the intrinsic viscosity formula from spheroids to arbitrary ellipsoids with semiaxes $a$, $b$ and $c$.

== Frequency dependence ==
The intrinsic viscosity formula may also be generalized to include a frequency dependence.

== Applications ==
The intrinsic viscosity is very sensitive to the axial ratio of spheroids, especially of prolate spheroids. For example, the intrinsic viscosity can provide rough estimates of the number of subunits in a protein fiber composed of a helical array of proteins such as tubulin. More generally, intrinsic viscosity can be used to assay quaternary structure. In polymer chemistry intrinsic viscosity is related to molar mass through the Mark–Houwink equation. A practical method for the determination of intrinsic viscosity is with a Ubbelohde viscometer or with a RheoSense VROC viscometer.
