= Huggins equation =

The Huggins Equation is an empirical equation used to relate the reduced viscosity of a dilute polymer solution to the concentration of the polymer in solution. It is named after Maurice L. Huggins. The Huggins equation states:

$\frac{\eta_s}{c}= [\eta] + k_H [\eta]^2 c$

Where ${\eta_s}$ is the specific viscosity of a solution at a given concentration of a polymer in solution, $[\eta]$ is the intrinsic viscosity of the solution, $k_H$ is the Huggins coefficient, and $c$ is the concentration of the polymer in solution. In isolation, $n_s$ is the specific viscosity of a solution at a given concentration.

The Huggins equation is valid when $[\eta]c$ is much smaller than 1, indicating that it is a dilute solution. The Huggins coefficient used in this equation is an indicator of the strength of a solvent. The coefficient typically ranges from $k_H \approx 0.3$ (for strong solvents) to $k_H \approx 0.5$ (for poor solvents).

The Huggins equation is a useful tool because it can be used to determine the intrinsic viscosity, $[\eta]$, from experimental data by plotting $\frac{\eta_s}{c}$versus the concentration of the solution, $c$.

== See also ==
- Viscosity
- Rheology
