= 2MFGC 12344 =

LINER galaxy in the constellation of Serpens

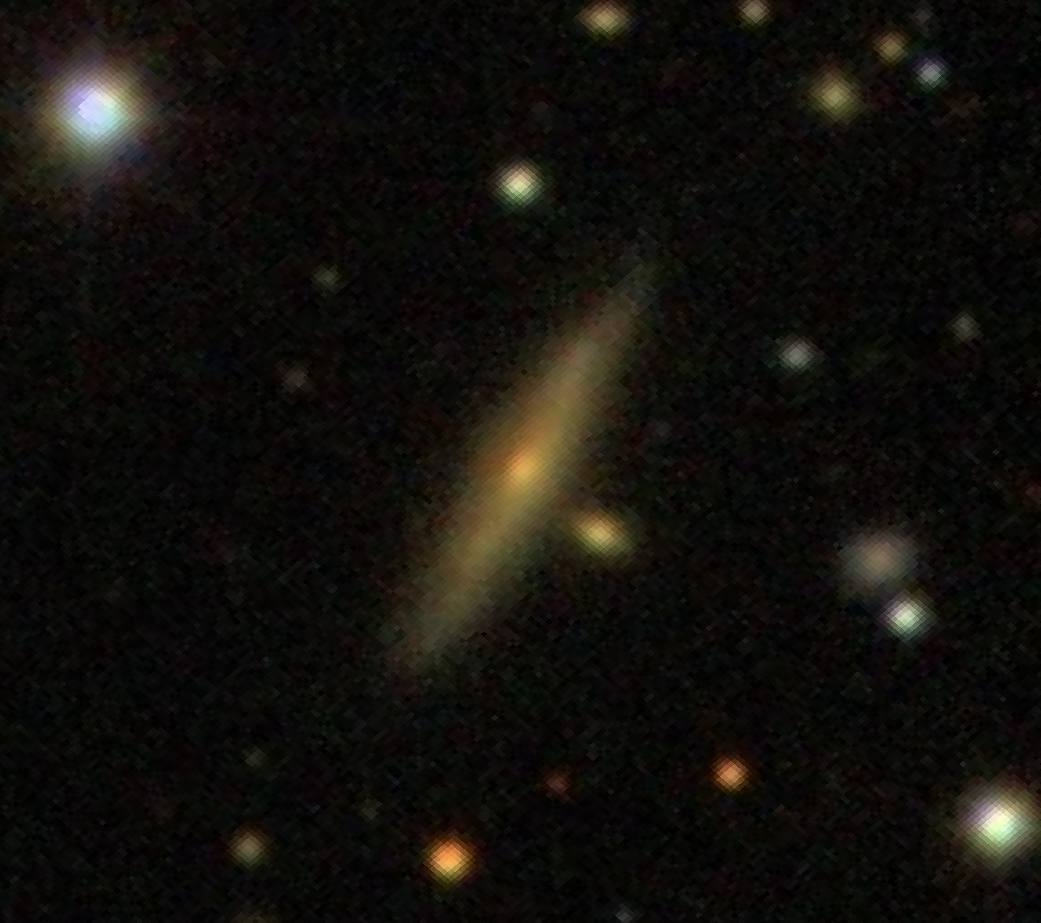
- SDSS image of 2MFGC 12344

Observation data (2000.0 epoch)
- Constellation: Serpens
- Right ascension: 15^{h} 15^{m} 46.11^{s}
- Declination: +02° 35′ 56.55″
- Redshift: 0.140613
- Heliocentric radial velocity: 42,155 ± 8 km/s
- Distance: 2,052.9 ± 143.7 Mly (629.42 ± 44.06 Mpc)
- magnitude (J): 13.89

Characteristics
- Type: BrCIG
- Size: ~538,000 ly (164.8 kpc) (estimated)

Other designations
- 2MASX J15154614+0235564, ASK 695361.0, LEDA 1231972, [LHC2018] J228.94209+02.59906, MaxBCG J228.94210+02.59905 BCG, SDSS J151546.10+023556.5, [TTL2012] 225728

2MFGC 12344 is a low-ionization nuclear emission-line region (LINER) galaxy located in the constellation of Serpens. The redshift of the galaxy is (z) 0.140 and it is categorized as a super spiral galaxy; a class of massive disk galaxies considered as star-forming.

== Description ==
2MFGC 12344 is classified as an edge-on spiral galaxy with a presence of a dust lane that is shown crossing a region above its central nucleus. The apparent luminosity has been estimated as L_{r} = 7.9 with a total r-band isophotal diameter of the galaxy being 120 kiloparsecs (Kpc) in total. The galaxy also has a total star formation rate that is estimated to be 1.35 M_{☉} per year based on a 12 micrometer band system conducted by Wide-field Infrared Survey Explorer (WISE) while the total mass of the stars of the galaxy is estimated to be 11.74 M_{☉} based on its W-1 band luminosity. The gas mass is 10.7 M_{☉} based on star formation rate.

The inclination angle of 2MFGC 12344 is found to be 78° based on the estimation of its z-band axial ratio. The position angle of the galaxy is roughly 150° with its warm ionized gas content displaying a velocity dispersion of 21 ± 4 kilometers per seconds. Evidence also showed the galaxy has a fast rotating stellar disk with a rotation velocity that reaches until 530 kilometers per seconds, indicating its own dynamics are dominated by a dark matter halo that is also located inside its inner regions in addition. The stellar disk itself, is found to be very large with an expansion of 200 kiloparsecs in total.
