= Inherent viscosity =

In polymer science, inherent viscosity is the ratio of the natural logarithm of the relative viscosity of a polymer to its mass concentration. Inherent viscosity scales inversely to mass density, and a common unit is dL/g.

Inherent viscosity is defined as
$$\eta_{inh} = \frac{\ln \eta_{rel}}{c}$$
where $c$ is the mass concentration of the polymer and $\eta_{rel}$ is the relative viscosity, which is defined as
$$\eta_{rel}= \frac{\eta}{\eta_{s}}$$
where $\eta$ is the viscosity of the solution and $\eta_s$ is the viscosity of the solvent.

The definition of $\eta_\text{inh}$ is a finite difference approximation to the derivative
$$\left.\frac{d(\ln(\eta))}{dc}\right|_{c=0}$$
That ideal limiting value is the intrinsic viscosity, which is a good measure of the polymerization degree.
