= Flow birefringence =

In biochemistry, flow birefringence is a hydrodynamic technique for measuring the rotational diffusion constants (or, equivalently, the rotational drag coefficients). The birefringence of a solution sandwiched between two concentric cylinders is measured as a function of the difference in rotational speed between the inner and outer cylinders. The flow tends to orient an ellipsoidal particle (typically, a protein, virus, etc.) in one direction, whereas rotational diffusion (tumbling) causes the molecule to become disoriented. The equilibrium between these two processes as a function of the flow provides a measure of the axial ratio of the ellipsoidal particle.

== See also ==
- Perrin friction factors
