= Ubbelohde viscometer =

Capillary-based viscometer

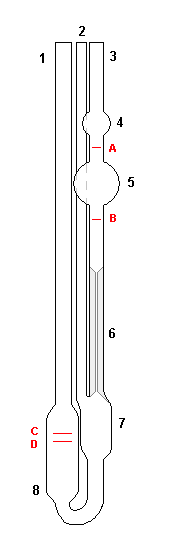
Ubbelohde viscometer. 1)Filling tube 2)Venting Tube 3)Capillary Tube 4)Feeder Bulb 5)Measuring Bulb 6)Capillary 7)Level Bulb 8)Reservoir A-B)Timing Marks C-D)Max/Min Marks

An Ubbelohde type viscometer or suspended-level viscometer is a measuring instrument which uses a capillary based method of measuring viscosity. It is recommended for higher viscosity cellulosic polymer solutions. The advantage of this instrument is that the values obtained are independent of the total volume. The device was developed by the German chemist Leo Ubbelohde (1877-1964).

ASTM and other test methods are: ISO 3104, ISO 3105, ASTM D445, ASTM D446, ASTM D4020, IP 71, BS 188.

The Ubbelohde viscometer is closely related to the Ostwald viscometer. Both are u-shaped pieces of glassware with a reservoir on one side and a measuring bulb with a capillary on the other. A liquid is introduced into the reservoir then sucked through the capillary and measuring bulb. The liquid is allowed to travel back through the measuring bulb and the time it takes for the liquid to pass through two calibrated marks is a measure for viscosity. The Ubbelohde device has a third arm extending from the end of the capillary and open to the atmosphere. In this way the pressure head only depends on a fixed height and no longer on the total volume of liquid.

== Determination of viscosity ==
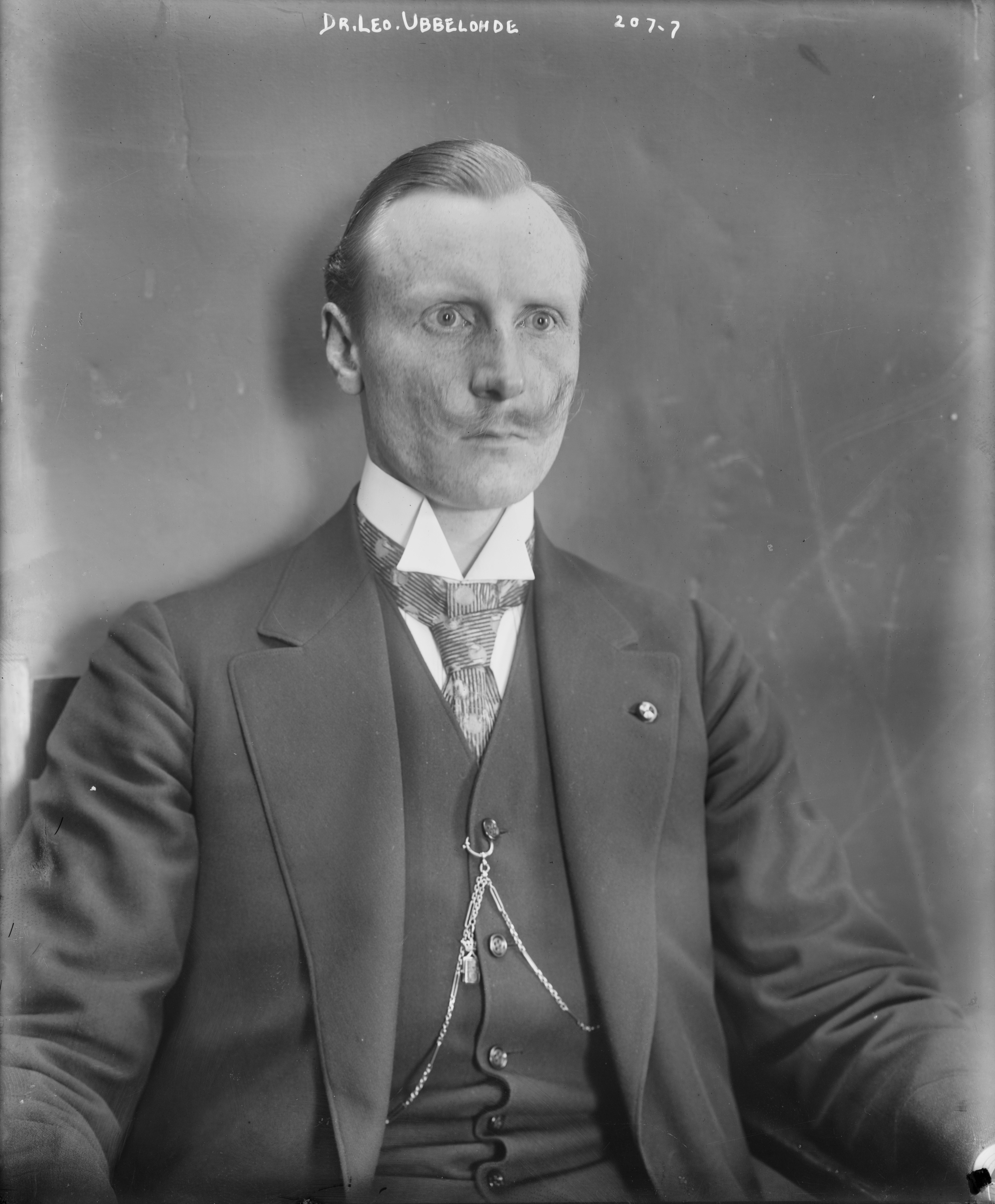
Dr. Leo Ubbelohde, the inventor of the Ubbelohde viscometer

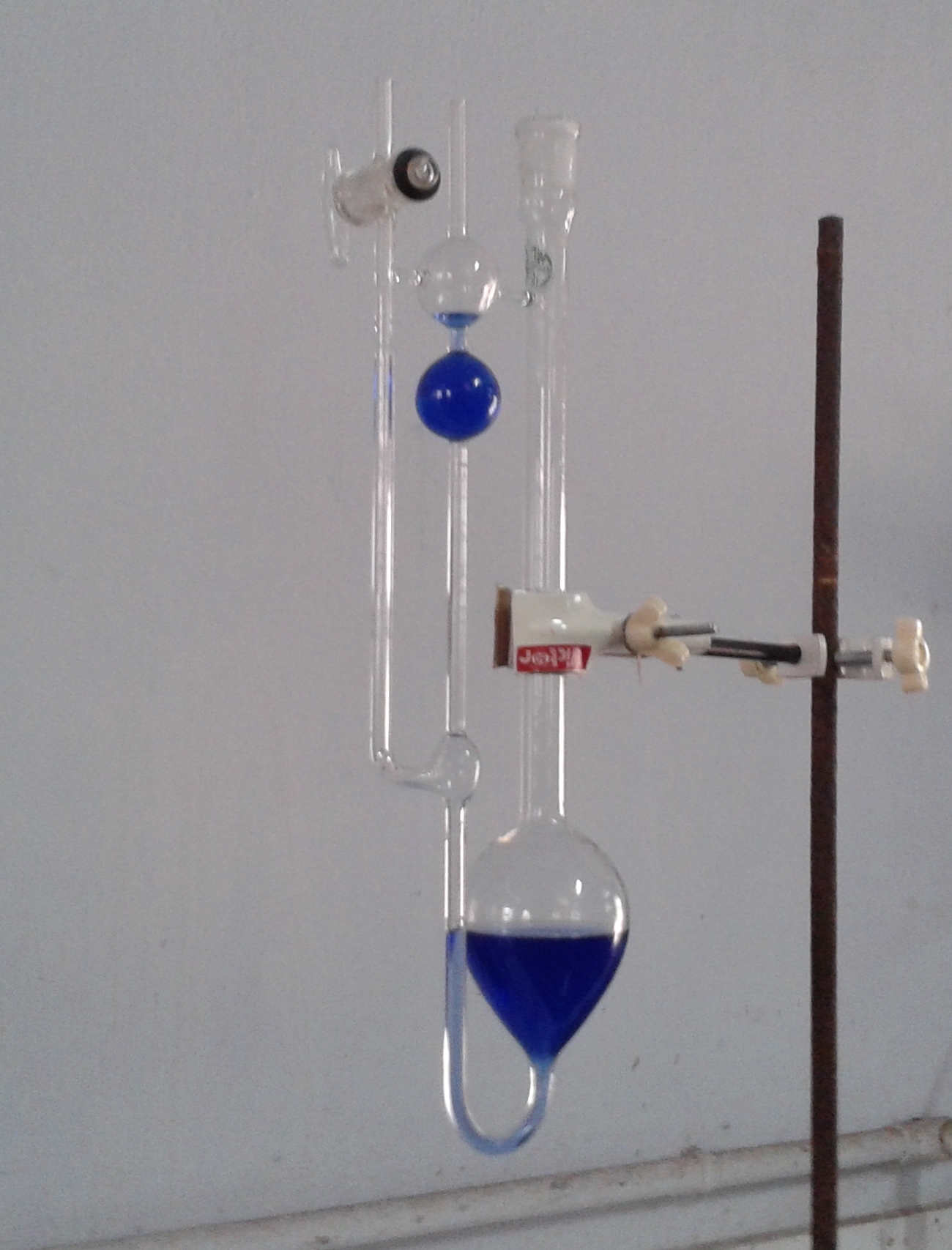
Viscosity measurement of polymer solution using Ubbelohde viscometer

The determination of viscosity is based on Poiseuille's law:

$$\frac{dV}{dt} = v \pi R^{2} = \frac{\pi R^{4}}{8 \eta} \left( \frac{- \Delta P}{\Delta x}\right) = \frac{\pi R^{4}}{8 \eta} \frac{ |\Delta P|}{L},$$

where t is the time it takes for a volume V to elute. The ratio $\frac{dv}{dt}$ depends on R as the capillary radius, on the average applied pressure P, on its length L and on the dynamic viscosity η.

The average pressure head is given by:

$$\Delta P = \rho g \Delta H \,$$

with ρ the density of the liquid, g the Standard gravity and H the average head of the liquid. In this way the viscosity of a fluid can be determined.

Usually the viscosity of a liquid is compared to a liquid with an analyte for example a polymer dissolved in it. The relative viscosity is given by:

$$\eta_r = \frac{\eta}{\eta_0} = \frac{t \rho}{t_0 \rho_0},$$

where t_{0} and ρ_{0} are the elution time and density of the pure liquid. When the solution is very diluted

$$\rho \simeq  \rho_0 \,$$

the so-called specific viscosity becomes:

$$\eta_{sp} = \eta_r - 1 =  \frac{t - t_0}{t_0}. \,$$

This specific viscosity is related to the concentration of the analyte through the Intrinsic viscosity [η] by the power series:

$$\eta_{sp} =  [\eta] c + k [\eta]^2 c^2 + \cdots\,$$

or

$$\frac{\eta_{sp}}{c} =  [\eta] + k[\eta]^2 c + \cdots,\,$$

where $\frac{\eta_{sp}}{c}$ is called the viscosity number.

The intrinsic viscosity can be determined experimentally by measuring the viscosity number as function of concentration as the Y-axis intercept.
