= Spheroidal wave equation =

Math equation

In mathematics, the spheroidal wave equation is given by

$$(1-t^2)\frac{d^2y}{dt^2} -2(b+1) t\, \frac{d y}{dt} + (c - 4qt^2) \, y=0$$

It is a generalization of the Mathieu differential equation. If $y(t)$ is a solution to this equation and we define $S(t):=(1-t^2)^{b/2}y(t)$, then $S(t)$ is a prolate spheroidal wave function in the sense that it satisfies the equation

$$(1-t^2)\frac{d^2S}{dt^2} -2 t\, \frac{d S}{dt} + (c - 4q + b + b^2 + 4q(1-t^2) - \frac{b^2}{1-t^2} ) \, S=0$$

== See also ==
- Wave equation
