= Perrin friction factors =

In hydrodynamics, the Perrin friction factors are multiplicative adjustments to the translational and rotational friction of a rigid spheroid, relative to the corresponding frictions in spheres of the same volume. These friction factors were first calculated by Jean-Baptiste Perrin.

These factors pertain to spheroids (i.e., to ellipsoids of revolution), which are characterized by the axial ratio p = (a/b), defined here as the axial semiaxis a (i.e., the semiaxis along the axis of revolution) divided by the equatorial semiaxis b. In prolate spheroids, the axial ratio p > 1 since the axial semiaxis is longer than the equatorial semiaxes. Conversely, in oblate spheroids, the axial ratio p < 1 since the axial semiaxis is shorter than the equatorial semiaxes. Finally, in spheres, the axial ratio p = 1, since all three semiaxes are equal in length.

The formulae presented below assume "stick" (not "slip") boundary conditions, i.e., it is assumed that the velocity of the fluid is zero at the surface of the spheroid.

== Perrin S factor ==
For brevity in the equations below, we define the Perrin S factor. For prolate spheroids (i.e., cigar-shaped spheroids with two short axes and one long axis)

$$S \ \stackrel{\mathrm{def}}{=}\   2 \frac{\mathrm{atanh} \  \xi}{\xi}$$

where the parameter $\xi$ is defined

$$\xi \ \stackrel{\mathrm{def}}{=}\   \frac{\sqrt{\left| p^{2} - 1 \right|}}{p}$$

Similarly, for oblate spheroids (i.e., discus-shaped spheroids with two long axes and one short axis)

$$S \ \stackrel{\mathrm{def}}{=}\   2 \frac{\mathrm{atan} \  \xi}{\xi}$$

For spheres, $S = 2$, as may be shown by taking the limit $p \rightarrow 1$ for the prolate or oblate spheroids.

== Translational friction factor ==
The frictional coefficient of an arbitrary spheroid of volume $V$ equals

$$f_{tot} = f_{sphere} \ f_{P}$$

where $f_{sphere}$ is the translational friction coefficient of a sphere of equivalent volume (Stokes' law)

$$f_{sphere} = 6 \pi \eta R_{eff} = 6\pi \eta \left(\frac{3V}{4\pi}\right)^{(1/3)}$$

and $f_{P}$ is the Perrin translational friction factor

$$f_{P} \ \stackrel{\mathrm{def}}{=}\   \frac{2p^{2/3}}{S}$$

The frictional coefficient is related to the diffusion constant D by the Einstein relation

$$D = \frac{k_{B}T}{f_{tot}}$$

Hence, $f_{tot}$ can be measured directly using analytical ultracentrifugation, or indirectly using various methods to determine the diffusion constant (e.g., NMR and dynamic light scattering).

== Rotation friction factor ==
There are two rotational friction factors for a general spheroid, one for a rotation about the axial semiaxis (denoted $F_{ax}$) and other for a rotation about one of the equatorial semiaxes (denoted $F_{eq}$). Perrin showed that

$$F_{ax} \ \stackrel{\mathrm{def}}{=}\   \left( \frac{4}{3} \right) \frac{p^{2}-1}{2 p^{2} - S}$$

$$F_{eq} \ \stackrel{\mathrm{def}}{=}\   \left( \frac{4}{3} \right) \frac{(1/p)^{2} - p^{2}}{2 - S \left[ 2 - (1/p)^{2} \right]}$$

for both prolate and oblate spheroids. For spheres, $F_{ax} = F_{eq} = 1$, as may be seen by taking the limit $p \rightarrow 1$.

These formulae may be numerically unstable when $p \approx 1$, since the numerator and denominator both go to zero into the $p \rightarrow 1$ limit. In such cases, it may be better to expand in a series, e.g.,

$$\frac{1}{F_{ax}} = 1.0 +
\left(\frac{4}{5}\right) \left( \frac{\xi^{2}}{1 + \xi^{2}}\right) +
\left(\frac{4 \cdot 6}{5 \cdot 7}\right) \left( \frac{\xi^{2}}{1 + \xi^{2}}\right)^{2} +
\left(\frac{4 \cdot 6 \cdot 8}{5 \cdot 7 \cdot 9}\right) \left( \frac{\xi^{2}}{1 + \xi^{2}}\right)^{3} + \ldots$$

for oblate spheroids.

== Time constants for rotational relaxation ==
The rotational friction factors are rarely observed directly. Rather, one measures the exponential rotational relaxation(s) in response to an orienting force (such as flow, applied electric field, etc.). The time constant for relaxation of the axial direction vector is

$$\tau_{ax} = \left( \frac{1}{k_{B}T} \right) \frac{F_{eq}}{2}$$

whereas that for the equatorial direction vectors is

$$\tau_{eq} = \left( \frac{1}{k_{B}T} \right) \frac{F_{ax}F_{eq}}{F_{ax} + F_{eq}}$$

These time constants can differ significantly when the axial ratio $\rho$ deviates significantly from 1, especially for prolate spheroids. Experimental methods for measuring these time constants include fluorescence anisotropy, NMR, flow birefringence and dielectric spectroscopy.

It may seem paradoxical that $\tau_{ax}$ involves $F_{eq}$. This arises because re-orientations of the axial direction vector occur through rotations about the perpendicular axes, i.e., about the equatorial axes. Similar reasoning pertains to $\tau_{eq}$.
