= Prolate spheroidal coordinates =

Three-dimensional coordinate system

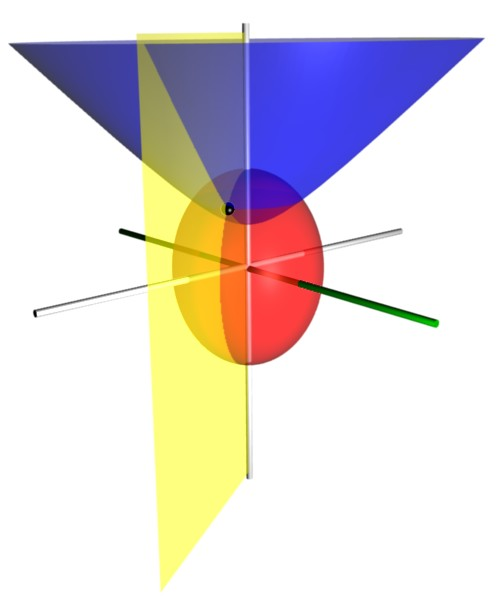
The three coordinate surfaces of prolate spheroidal coordinates. The red prolate spheroid (stretched sphere) corresponds to μ = 1, and the blue two-sheet hyperboloid corresponds to ν = 45°. The yellow half-plane corresponds to φ = −60°, which is measured relative to the x-axis (highlighted in green). The black sphere represents the intersection point of the three surfaces, which has Cartesian coordinates of roughly (0.831, −1.439, 2.182).

Prolate spheroidal coordinates are a three-dimensional orthogonal coordinate system that results from rotating the two-dimensional elliptic coordinate system about the focal axis of the ellipse, i.e., the symmetry axis on which the foci are located. Rotation about the other axis produces oblate spheroidal coordinates. Prolate spheroidal coordinates can also be considered as a limiting case of ellipsoidal coordinates in which the two smallest principal axes are equal in length.

Prolate spheroidal coordinates can be used to solve various partial differential equations in which the boundary conditions match its symmetry and shape, such as solving for a field produced by two centers, which are taken as the foci on the z-axis. One example is solving for the wavefunction of an electron moving in the electromagnetic field of two positively charged nuclei, as in the hydrogen molecular ion, H_{2}^{+}. Another example is solving for the electric field generated by two small electrode tips. Other limiting cases include areas generated by a line segment (μ = 0) or a line with a missing segment (ν=0). The electronic structure of general diatomic molecules with many electrons can also be solved to excellent precision in the prolate spheroidal coordinate system.

== Definition ==
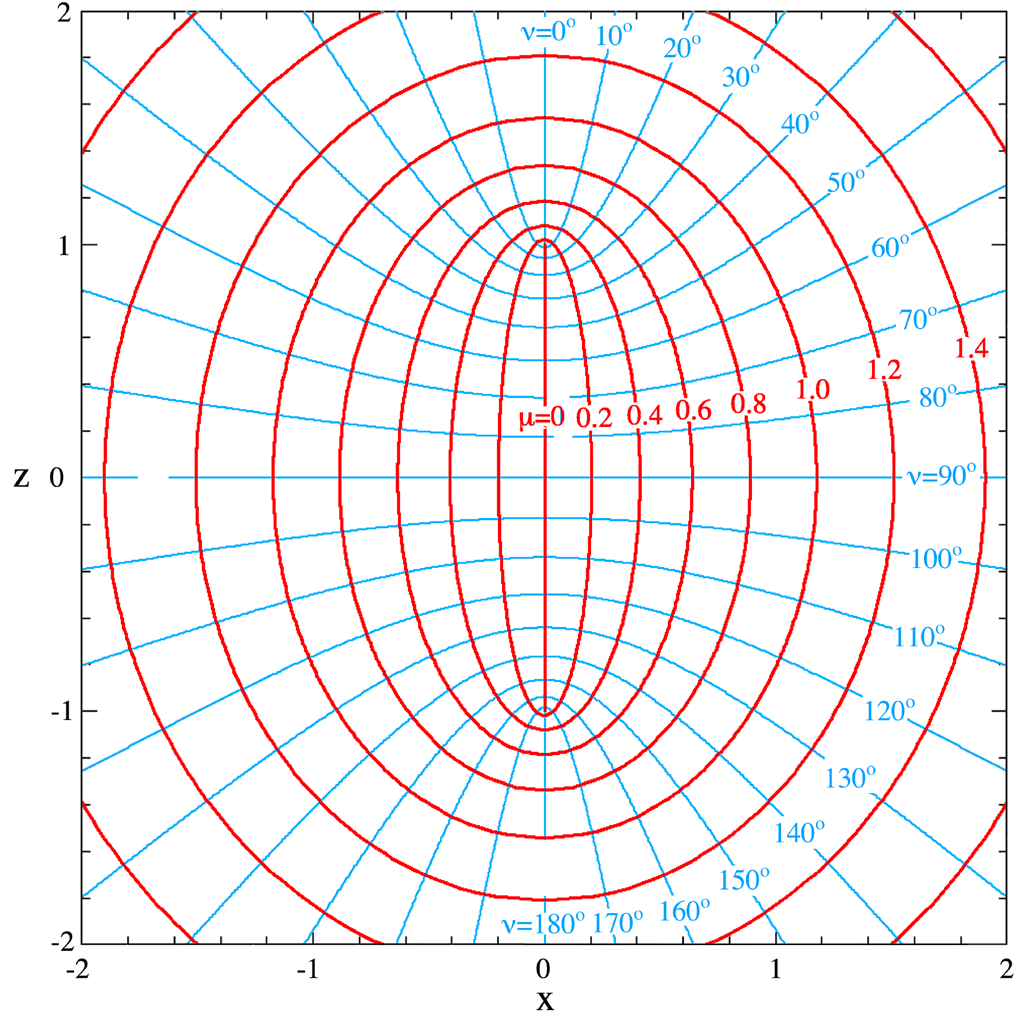
Prolate spheroidal coordinates μ and ν for a = 1. The lines of equal values of μ and ν are shown on the xz-plane, i.e. for φ = 0. The surfaces of constant μ and ν are obtained by rotation about the z-axis, so that the diagram is valid for any plane containing the z-axis: i.e. for any φ.

The most common definition of prolate spheroidal coordinates $(\mu, \nu, \varphi)$ is

$$x = a \sinh \mu \sin \nu \cos \varphi$$

$$y = a \sinh \mu \sin \nu \sin \varphi$$

$$z = a \cosh \mu \cos \nu$$

where $\mu$ is a nonnegative real number and $\nu \in [0, \pi]$. The azimuthal angle $\varphi$ belongs to the interval $[0, 2\pi]$.

The trigonometric identity

$$\frac{z^2}{a^2 \cosh^2 \mu} + \frac{x^2 + y^2}{a^2 \sinh^2 \mu} = \cos^2 \nu + \sin^2 \nu = 1$$

shows that surfaces of constant $\mu$ form prolate spheroids, since they are ellipses rotated about the axis joining their foci. Similarly, the hyperbolic trigonometric identity

$$\frac{z^2}{a^2 \cos^2 \nu} - \frac{x^2 + y^2}{a^2 \sin^2 \nu} = \cosh^2 \mu - \sinh^2 \mu = 1$$

shows that surfaces of constant $\nu$ form hyperboloids of revolution.

The distances from the foci located at $(x, y, z) = (0, 0, \pm a)$ are

$$r_\pm = \sqrt{x^2 + y^2 + (z \mp a)^2} = a(\cosh \mu \mp \cos \nu).$$

== Scale factors ==
The scale factors for the elliptic coordinates $(\mu, \nu)$ are equal

$$h_\mu = h_\nu = a\sqrt{\sinh^2\mu + \sin^2\nu}$$

whereas the azimuthal scale factor is

$$h_\varphi = a \sinh\mu \sin\nu,$$

resulting in a metric of

$$\begin{align}
ds^2 &= h_\mu^2 d\mu^2 + h_\nu^2 d\nu^2 + h_\varphi^2 d\varphi^2 \\
&= a^2 \left[ (\sinh^2\mu + \sin^2\nu) d\mu^2 + (\sinh^2\mu + \sin^2\nu) d\nu^2 + (\sinh^2\mu \sin^2\nu) d\varphi^2 \right].
\end{align}$$

Consequently, an infinitesimal volume element equals

$$dV = a^3 \sinh\mu \sin\nu ( \sinh^2 \mu + \sin^2 \nu) \, d\mu \, d\nu \, d\varphi$$

and the Laplacian can be written

$$\begin{align}
\nabla^2 \Phi = {} & \frac{1}{a^2 (\sinh^2 \mu + \sin^2 \nu)}
\left[ \frac{\partial^2 \Phi}{\partial \mu^2} +
\frac{\partial^2 \Phi}{\partial \nu^2} +
\coth \mu \frac{\partial \Phi}{\partial \mu} +
\cot \nu \frac{\partial \Phi}{\partial \nu}
\right] \\[6pt]
& {} + \frac{1}{a^2 \sinh^2 \mu \sin^2\nu}
\frac{\partial^2 \Phi}{\partial \varphi^2}
\end{align}$$

Other differential operators such as $\nabla \cdot \mathbf{F}$ and $\nabla \times \mathbf{F}$ can be expressed in the coordinates $(\mu, \nu, \varphi)$ by substituting the scale factors into the general formulae found in orthogonal coordinates.

== Alternative definition(1) ==
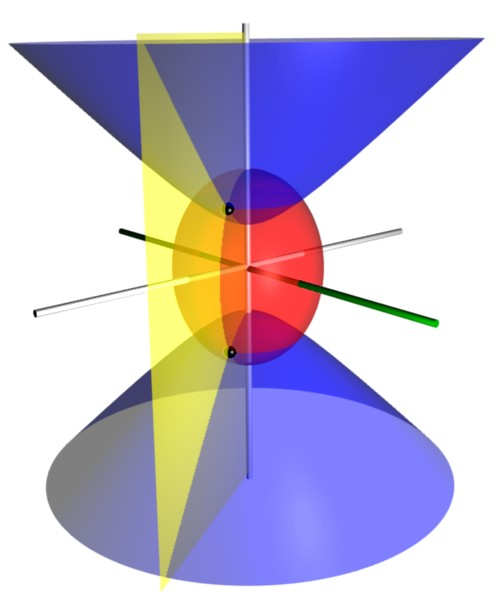
In principle, a definition of prolate spheroidal coordinates could be degenerate. In other words, a single set of coordinates might correspond to two points in Cartesian coordinates; this is illustrated here with two black spheres, one on each sheet of the hyperboloid and located at (x, y, ±z). However, neither of the definitions presented here are degenerate.

An alternative and geometrically intuitive set of prolate spheroidal coordinates $(\sigma, \tau, \phi)$ are sometimes used, where $\sigma = \cosh \mu$ and $\tau = \cos \nu$. Hence, the curves of constant $\sigma$ are prolate spheroids, whereas the curves of constant $\tau$ are hyperboloids of revolution. The coordinate $\tau$ belongs to the interval [−1, 1], whereas the $\sigma$ coordinate must be greater than or equal to one.

The coordinates $\sigma$ and $\tau$ have a simple relation to the distances to the foci $F_{1}$ and $F_{2}$. For any point in the plane, the sum $d_{1}+d_{2}$ of its distances to the foci equals $2a\sigma$, whereas their difference $d_{1}-d_{2}$ equals $2a\tau$. Thus, the distance to $F_{1}$ is $a(\sigma+\tau)$, whereas the distance to $F_{2}$ is $a(\sigma-\tau)$. (Recall that $F_{1}$ and $F_{2}$ are located at $z=-a$ and $z=+a$, respectively.) This gives the following expressions for $\sigma$, $\tau$, and $\varphi$:

$$\sigma = \frac 1 {2a} \left(\sqrt{x^2+y^2+(z+a)^2}+\sqrt{x^2+y^2+(z-a)^2}\right)$$

$$\tau = \frac 1 {2a} \left(\sqrt{x^2+y^2+(z+a)^2}-\sqrt{x^2+y^2+(z-a)^2}\right)$$

$$\varphi = \arctan\left(\frac y x \right)$$

Unlike the analogous oblate spheroidal coordinates, the prolate spheroid coordinates (σ, τ, φ) are not degenerate; in other words, there is a unique, reversible correspondence between them and the Cartesian coordinates

$$x  = a \sqrt{(\sigma^2 - 1) (1 - \tau^2)} \cos \varphi$$

$$y  = a \sqrt{(\sigma^2 - 1) (1 - \tau^2)} \sin \varphi$$

$$z = a\ \sigma\ \tau$$

== Alternative scale factors ==
The scale factors for the alternative elliptic coordinates $(\sigma, \tau, \varphi)$ are

$$h_{\sigma} = a\sqrt{\frac{\sigma^{2} - \tau^{2}}{\sigma^{2} - 1}}$$

$$h_{\tau} = a\sqrt{\frac{\sigma^{2} - \tau^{2}}{1 - \tau^{2}}}$$

while the azimuthal scale factor is now

$$h_\varphi = a \sqrt{\left( \sigma^{2} - 1 \right) \left( 1 - \tau^{2} \right)}$$

Hence, the infinitesimal volume element becomes

$$dV = a^3 (\sigma^2 - \tau^2) \, d\sigma \, d\tau \, d\varphi$$

and the Laplacian equals

$$\begin{align}
\nabla^2 \Phi = {} &
\frac{1}{a^2 (\sigma^2 - \tau^2)}
\left\{ \frac{\partial}{\partial \sigma} \left[
\left( \sigma^2 - 1 \right) \frac{\partial \Phi}{\partial \sigma}
\right] + \frac{\partial}{\partial \tau} \left[
(1 - \tau^2) \frac{\partial \Phi}{\partial \tau}
\right]
\right\} \\
& {} + \frac{1}{a^2 (\sigma^2 - 1) (1 - \tau^2)}
\frac{\partial^2 \Phi}{\partial \varphi^2}
\end{align}$$

Other differential operators such as $\nabla \cdot \mathbf{F}$ and $\nabla \times \mathbf{F}$ can be expressed in the coordinates $(\sigma, \tau)$ by substituting the scale factors into the general formulae found in orthogonal coordinates.

As is the case with spherical coordinates, Laplace's equation may be solved by the method of separation of variables to yield solutions in the form of prolate spheroidal harmonics, which are convenient to use when boundary conditions are defined on a surface with a constant prolate spheroidal coordinate (See Smythe, 1968).

== Alternative definition(2) ==
Prolate spheroidal coordinates (η, θ, ϕ; d) are defined in terms of Cartesian coordinates (x,y,z) by:

$$\begin{aligned}
x &= \sqrt{\eta^2 - d^2}\,\sin\theta\cos\phi,\\
y &= \sqrt{\eta^2 - d^2}\,\sin\theta\sin\phi,\\
z &= \eta\,\cos\theta,
\end{aligned}$$

where

$0\le\theta\le\pi,\quad 0\le\phi<2\pi,$

and 𝑑>0 denotes the focal distance (half the separation between the foci of a cross-sectional ellipse). Note that if d=0, the cross-section is a circle, and coordinates become those for a sphere. The normal to the surface at each point is η, which has its length equal to the semi-major axis of a cross-sectional ellipse.

== Bibliography ==
=== No angles convention ===
- Morse PM, Feshbach H (1953). Methods of Theoretical Physics, Part I. New York: McGraw-Hill. p. 661. Uses ξ_{1} = a cosh μ, ξ_{2} = sin ν, and ξ_{3} = cos φ.
- Zwillinger D (1992). Handbook of Integration. Boston, MA: Jones and Bartlett. p. 114. ISBN 0-86720-293-9. Same as Morse & Feshbach (1953), substituting u_{k} for ξ_{k}.
- Smythe, WR (1968). Static and Dynamic Electricity (3rd ed.). New York: McGraw-Hill.
- Sauer R, Szabó I (1967). Mathematische Hilfsmittel des Ingenieurs. New York: Springer Verlag. p. 97. LCCN 67025285. Uses coordinates ξ = cosh μ, η = sin ν, and φ.

=== Angle convention ===
- Korn GA, Korn TM (1961). Mathematical Handbook for Scientists and Engineers. New York: McGraw-Hill. p. 177. LCCN 59014456. Korn and Korn use the (μ, ν, φ) coordinates, but also introduce the degenerate (σ, τ, φ) coordinates.
- Margenau H, Murphy GM (1956). The Mathematics of Physics and Chemistry. New York: D. van Nostrand. pp. 180–182. LCCN 55010911. Similar to Korn and Korn (1961), but uses colatitude θ = 90° - ν instead of latitude ν.
- Moon PH, Spencer DE (1988). "Prolate Spheroidal Coordinates (η, θ, ψ)". Field Theory Handbook, Including Coordinate Systems, Differential Equations, and Their Solutions (corrected 2nd ed., 3rd print ed.). New York: Springer Verlag. pp. 28–30 (Table 1.06). ISBN 0-387-02732-7. Moon and Spencer use the colatitude convention θ = 90° − ν, and rename φ as ψ.

=== Unusual convention ===
- Landau LD, Lifshitz EM, Pitaevskii LP (1984). Electrodynamics of Continuous Media (Volume 8 of the Course of Theoretical Physics) (2nd ed.). New York: Pergamon Press. pp. 19–29. ISBN 978-0-7506-2634-7. Treats the prolate spheroidal coordinates as a limiting case of the general ellipsoidal coordinates. Uses (ξ, η, ζ) coordinates that have the units of distance squared.
