= Prolate spheroidal wave function =

Special type of functions in mathematics

In mathematics, prolate spheroidal wave functions (PSWFs) are eigenfunctions of the Laplacian in prolate spheroidal coordinates, adapted to boundary conditions on certain ellipsoids of revolution (an ellipse rotated around its long axis, cigar shape). Related are the oblate spheroidal wave functions (pancake shaped ellipsoid).

== Solutions to the wave equation ==
Solve the Helmholtz equation, $\nabla^2 \Phi + k^2 \Phi=0$, by the method of separation of variables in prolate spheroidal coordinates, $(\xi,\eta,\varphi)$, with:

$$\ x=a \sqrt{(\xi^2-1)(1-\eta^2)} \cos \varphi,$$

$$\ y=a \sqrt{(\xi^2-1)(1-\eta^2)} \sin \varphi,$$

$$\ z=a \, \xi \, \eta,$$

and $\xi \ge 1$, $|\eta| \le 1$, and $0 \le \varphi \le 2\pi$. Here, $2a > 0$ is the interfocal distance of the elliptical cross section of the prolate spheroid. Setting $c=ka$, the solution $\Phi(\xi,\eta,\varphi)$ can be written as the product of $e^{{\rm i} m \varphi}$, a radial spheroidal wave function $R_{mn}(c,\xi)$ and an angular spheroidal wave function $S_{mn}(c,\eta)$.

The radial wave function $R_{mn}(c,\xi)$ satisfies the linear ordinary differential equation:

$$\ (\xi^2 -1) \frac{d^2  R_{mn}(c,\xi)}{d \xi ^2} + 2\xi \frac{d  R_{mn}(c,\xi)}{d \xi} -\left(\lambda_{mn}(c) -c^2 \xi^2 +\frac{m^2}{\xi^2-1}\right) {R_{mn}(c,\xi)} = 0$$

The angular wave function satisfies the differential equation:

$$\ (1 - \eta^2) \frac{d^2  S_{mn}(c,\eta)}{d \eta ^2} - 2\eta \frac{d  S_{mn}(c,\eta)}{d \eta} +\left(\lambda_{mn}(c) -c^2 \eta^2 +\frac{m^2}{\eta^2-1}\right) {S_{mn}(c,\eta)} = 0$$

It is the same differential equation as in the case of the radial wave function. However, the range of the variable is different: in the radial wave function, $\xi \ge 1$, while in the angular wave function, $|\eta| \le 1$. The eigenvalue $\lambda_{mn}(c)$ of this Sturm–Liouville problem is fixed by the requirement that ${S_{mn}(c,\eta)}$ must be finite for $\eta \to \pm1$.

For $c=0$ both differential equations reduce to the equations satisfied by the associated Legendre polynomials. For $c\ne 0$, the angular spheroidal wave functions can be expanded as a series of Legendre functions.

If one writes $S_{mn}(c,\eta)=(1-\eta^2)^{m/2} Y_{mn}(c,\eta)$, the function $Y_{mn}(c,\eta)$ satisfies

$$\ (1-\eta^2) \frac{d^2  Y_{mn}(c,\eta)}{d \eta ^2} -2 (m+1) \eta \frac{d  Y_{mn}(c,\eta)}{d \eta} - \left(c^2 \eta^2 +m(m+1)-\lambda_{mn}(c)\right) {Y_{mn}(c,\eta)} = 0,$$

which is known as the spheroidal wave equation. This auxiliary equation has been used by Stratton.

== Band-limited signals ==
In signal processing, the prolate spheroidal wave functions are useful as eigenfunctions of a time-limiting operation followed by a low-pass filter. Let $D$ denote the time truncation operator, such that $f(t)=D f(t)$ if and only if $f(t)$ has support on $[-T, T]$. Similarly, let $B$ denote an ideal low-pass filtering operator, such that $f(t)=B f(t)$ if and only if its Fourier transform is limited to $[-\Omega, \Omega]$. The operator $BD$ turns out to be linear, bounded and self-adjoint. For $n=0,1,2,\ldots$ we denote by$\psi_n(c,t)$ the $n$-th eigenfunction, defined as

$$\ BD \psi_n(c,t) = \frac{1}{2\pi}\int_{-\Omega}^\Omega \left(\int_{-T}^T \psi_n(c,\tau)e^{-i\omega \tau} \, d\tau\right)e^{i\omega t} \, d\omega = \lambda_n(c)\psi_n(c,t),$$

where $1>\lambda_0(c)>\lambda_1(c)>\cdots>0$ are the associated eigenvalues, and $c=T\Omega$ is a constant. The band-limited functions $\{\psi_n(c,t)\}_{n=0}^{\infty}$ are the PSWFs, proportional to the $S_{0n}(c, t/T)$ introduced above. (See also Spectral concentration problem.)

Pioneering work in this area was performed by Slepian and Pollak, Landau and Pollak, and Slepian.

PSWFs whose domain is a (portion of) the surface of the unit sphere are more generally called "Slepian functions". These are of great utility in disciplines such as geodesy, cosmology, or tomography

== Technical information and history ==
There are different normalization schemes for spheroidal functions. A table of the different schemes can be found in Abramowitz and Stegun who follow the notation of Flammer. The Digital Library of Mathematical Functions provided by NIST is an excellent resource for spheroidal wave functions.

Tables of numerical values of spheroidal wave functions are given in Flammer, Hunter, Hanish et al., and Van Buren et al.

Originally, the spheroidal wave functions were introduced by C. Niven, which lead to a Helmholtz equation in spheroidal coordinates. Monographs tying together many aspects of the theory of spheroidal wave functions were written by Strutt, Stratton et al., Meixner and Schafke, and Flammer.

Flammer provided a thorough discussion of the calculation of the eigenvalues, angular wavefunctions, and radial wavefunctions for both the prolate and the oblate case. Computer programs for this purpose have been developed by many, including King et al., Patz and Van Buren, Baier et al., Zhang and Jin, Thompson and Falloon. Van Buren and Boisvert have recently developed new methods for calculating prolate spheroidal wave functions that extend the ability to obtain numerical values to extremely wide parameter ranges. Fortran source code that combines the new results with traditional methods is available at http://www.mathieuandspheroidalwavefunctions.com.

Asymptotic expansions of angular PSWFs for large values of $c$ have been derived by Müller. He also investigated the relation between asymptotic expansions of spheroidal wave functions.
