= Leo Ubbelohde =

German chemist (1877–1964)

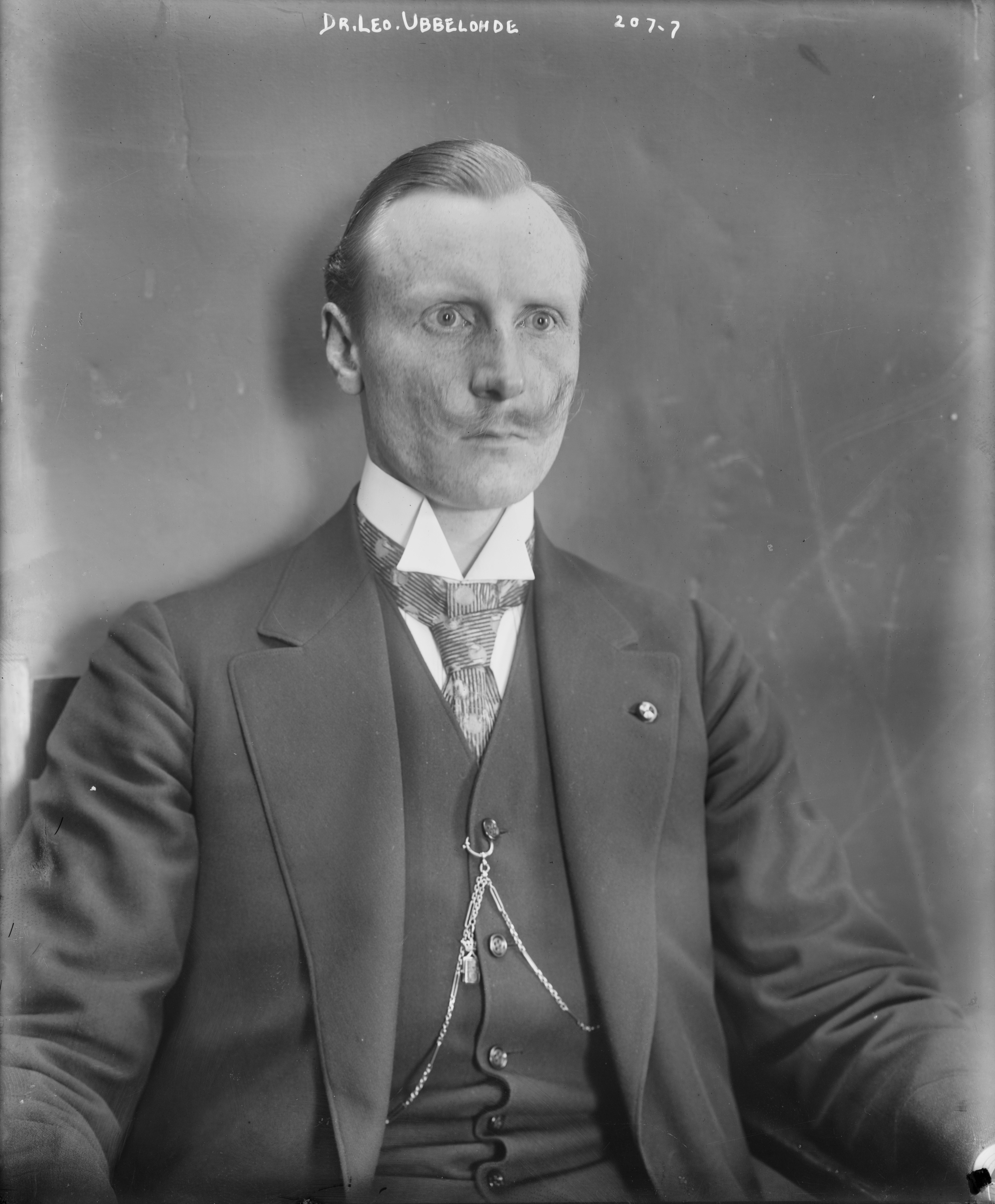
Leo Ubbelohde (1877–1964)

Leo Ubbelohde (4 January 1877, Hanover – 28 February 1964, Düsseldorf) was a German chemist.

During his career he served as a professor in Karlsruhe and Berlin. He is known for his research on mineral oils, fuels, catalysis and viscosity.

He was the inventor of a suspended-level viscometer used for determining kinetic viscosity, known today as a "Ubbelohde viscometer".

== Publications ==
- Über Kondensationen der Isatinsäure und des o-Amidobenzaldehyds mit Isonitrosoaceton, (1903)
- Handbuch der Chemie und Technologie der Öle und Fette : Chemie, Analyse, Gewinnung und Verarbeitung der Öle, Fette, Wachse und Harze.
- Zur Viskosimetrie. Anhang : Umwandlungs-tabellen für Viskositätszahlen, (1940).
