= Axial ratio =

Solid state physics

Axial ratio, for any structure or shape with two or more axes, is the ratio of the length (or magnitude) of those axes to each other - the longer axis divided by the shorter.

In chemistry or materials science, the axial ratio (symbol P) is used to describe rigid rod-like molecules. It is defined as the length of the rod divided by the rod diameter.

In physics, the axial ratio describes electromagnetic radiation with elliptical, or circular, polarization. The axial ratio is the ratio of the magnitudes of the major and minor axis defined by the electric field vector.

== See also ==
- Aspect ratio
- Degree of polarization
