= Relative viscosity =

Relative viscosity ($\eta_{rel}$) (a synonym of "viscosity ratio") is the ratio of the viscosity of a solution ($\eta$) to the viscosity of the solvent used ($\eta_s$),

$$\eta_{rel} = \frac{\eta}{\eta_s}$$.

The significance in Relative viscosity is that it can be analyzed the effect a polymer can have on a solution's viscosity such as increasing the solutions viscosity.

Lead Liquids possess an amount of internal friction that presents itself when stirred in the form of resistance. This resistance is the different layers of the liquid reacting to one another as they are stirred. This can be seen in things like syrup, which has a higher viscosity than water and exhibits less internal friction when stirred. The ratio of this viscosity is known as Relative Viscosity.
