= Lauricella =

Lauricella is an Italian surname. Notable people with the surname include:

- Giuseppe Lauricella (1867–1913), Italian mathematician
- Hank Lauricella (1930–2014), American football player and member of both houses of the Louisiana State Legislature
- Remo Lauricella (1912–2003), British composer and violinist
- Salvatore Lauricella (1922–1996), Italian attorney, politician, and chairman of the Italian Socialist Party
- Sergio Lauricella (1921–2008), Italian composer

== See also ==
- Lauricella's theorem
