= Legendre wavelet =

Type of wavelet

In functional analysis, compactly supported wavelets derived from Legendre polynomials are termed Legendre wavelets or spherical harmonic wavelets. Legendre functions have widespread applications in which spherical coordinate system is appropriate. As with many wavelets there is no nice analytical formula for describing these harmonic spherical wavelets. The low-pass filter associated to Legendre multiresolution analysis is a finite impulse response (FIR) filter.

Wavelets associated to FIR filters are commonly preferred in most applications. An extra appealing feature is that the Legendre filters are linear phase FIR (i.e. multiresolution analysis associated with linear phase filters). These wavelets have been implemented on MATLAB (wavelet toolbox). Although being compactly supported wavelet, legdN are not orthogonal (but for N = 1).

== Legendre multiresolution filters ==
Associated Legendre polynomials are the colatitudinal part of the spherical harmonics which are common to all separations of Laplace's equation in spherical polar coordinates. The radial part of the solution varies from one potential to another, but the harmonics are always the same and are a consequence of spherical symmetry. Spherical harmonics $P_n(z)$ are solutions of the Legendre $2^{nd}$-order differential equation, n integer:

$$\left (1-z^2 \right ) \frac {d^2y} {dz^2} - 2z \frac {dy} {dz} + n(n+1)y=0.$$

$P_n(\cos(\theta))$ polynomials can be used to define the smoothing filter $H(\omega)$ of a multiresolution analysis (MRA). Since the appropriate boundary conditions for an MRA are $|H(0)|=1$ and $|H(\pi)|=0$, the smoothing filter of an MRA can be defined so that the magnitude of the low-pass $|H(\omega)|$ can be associated to Legendre polynomials according to: $\nu=2n+1.$

$$|H_{\nu}(\omega)|= \left | \frac {P_{\nu} \left ( \cos \left ( \frac{\omega}{2} \right ) \right ) } {P_{\nu} \cos (0)} \right |$$

Illustrative examples of filter transfer functions for a Legendre MRA are shown in figure 1, for $\nu=1,3,5.$ A low-pass behaviour is exhibited for the filter H, as expected. The number of zeroes within $- \pi < \omega < \pi$ is equal to the degree of the Legendre polynomial. Therefore, the roll-off of side-lobes with frequency is easily controlled by the parameter $\nu$.

Figure 1 - Magnitude of the transfer function for Legendre multiresolution smoothing filters. Filter $|H_{\nu} (\omega)|$ for orders 1, 3, and 5.

The low-pass filter transfer function is given by

$$H_{\nu} (\omega)=-e^{-j \nu \frac {\omega - \pi} {2}} P_{\nu}  \left ( \cos \left ( \tfrac{\omega}{2} \right ) \right )$$

The transfer function of the high-pass analysing filter $G_{\nu} (\omega)$ is chosen according to Quadrature mirror filter condition, yielding:

$$H_{\nu} (\omega)=-e^{-j {(\nu-2)} \frac {\omega} {2}} P_{\nu} \left ( \sin \left ( \tfrac{\omega}{2} \right ) \right )$$

Indeed, $|G_{\nu}(0)|=0$ and $|G_{\nu}( \pi)|=1$, as expected.

== Legendre multiresolution filter coefficients ==
A suitable phase assignment is done so as to properly adjust the transfer function $H_{\nu} (\omega)$ to the form

$$H_{\nu} (\omega)= \frac {1} {\sqrt {2}} \sum_{k \in Z} h_k^{\nu} e^{-j \omega k}$$

The filter coefficients $\{ h_k \}_{k \in \Z}$ are given by:

$$h_k^{\nu}= - \frac {\sqrt {2}} {2^{2 \nu}} \binom{2k}{k} \binom{2 \nu -2k}{\nu -k}$$

from which the symmetry:

$${h_k^{\nu}}={h_{\nu -k}^{\nu}},$$

follows. There are just $\nu+1$ non-zero filter coefficients on $H_n (\omega)$, so that the Legendre wavelets have compact support for every odd integer $\nu$.

Table I - Smoothing Legendre FIR filter coefficients for $\nu=1,3,5$ ($N$ is the wavelet order.)

	$\nu=1 (N =1 )$	$\nu=3 (N=2)$	$\nu=5 (N=3)$
$h_0$	$- \tfrac{\sqrt {2}}{2}$	$- 5 \tfrac{\sqrt {2}}{16}$	$-63 \tfrac{\sqrt {2}}{256}$
$h_1$	$- \tfrac{\sqrt {2}}{2}$	$-3 \tfrac{\sqrt {2}}{16}$	$- 35 \tfrac{\sqrt {2}}{256}$
$h_2$		$-3 \tfrac{\sqrt {2}}{16}$	$-30 \tfrac{\sqrt {2}}{256}$
$h_3$		$- 5 \tfrac{\sqrt {2}}{16}$	$-30 \tfrac{\sqrt {2}}{256}$
$h_4$			$-35 \tfrac{\sqrt {2}}{256}$
$h_5$			$-63 \tfrac{\sqrt {2}}{256}$

N.B. The minus signal can be suppressed.

== Bibliography ==
- M.M.S. Lira, H.M. de Oliveira, M.A. Carvalho Jr, R.M.C.Souza, Compactly Supported Wavelets Derived from Legendre Polynomials: Spherical Harmonic Wavelets, In: Computational Methods in Circuits and Systems Applications, N.E. Mastorakis, I.A. Stahopulos, C. Manikopoulos, G.E. Antoniou, V.M. Mladenov, I.F. Gonos Eds., WSEAS press, pp. 211–215, 2003. ISBN 960-8052-88-2. Available at ee.ufpe.br
- A. A. Colomer and A. A. Colomer, Adaptive ECG Data Compression Using Discrete Legendre Transform, Digital Signal Processing, 7, 1997, pp. 222–228.
- A.G. Ramm, A.I. Zaslavsky, X-Ray Transform, the Legendre Transform, and Envelopes, J. of Math. Analysis and Appl., 183, pp. 528–546, 1994.
- C. Herley, M. Vetterli, Orthogonalization of Compactly Supported Wavelet Bases, IEEE Digital Signal Process. Workshop, 13-16 Sep., pp. 1.7.1-1.7.2, 1992.
- S. Mallat, A Theory for Multiresolution Signal Decomposition: The Wavelet Representation, IEEE Transactions on Pattern Analysis and Machine Intelligence, 11, July pp. 674–693, 1989.
- M. Vetterli, C. Herly, Wavelets and Filter Banks: Theory and Design, IEEE Trans. on Acoustics, Speech, and Signal Processing, 40, 9, p. 2207, 1992.
- M. Jaskula, New Windows Family Based on Modified Legendre Polynomials, IEEE Instrum. And Measurement Technol. Conf., Anchorage, AK, May, 2002, pp. 553–556.
