= Orthogonal functions =

Type of function

In mathematics, orthogonal functions belong to a function space that is a vector space equipped with a bilinear form. When the function space has an interval as the domain, the bilinear form may be the integral of the product of functions over the interval:
$$\langle f,g\rangle = \int \overline{f(x)}g(x)\,dx  .$$

The functions $f$ and $g$ are orthogonal when this integral is zero, i.e. $\langle f, \, g \rangle = 0$ whenever $f \neq g$. As with a basis of vectors in a finite-dimensional space, orthogonal functions can form an infinite basis for a function space. Conceptually, the above integral is the equivalent of a vector dot product; two vectors are mutually independent (orthogonal) if their dot-product is zero.

Suppose $\{ f_0, f_1, \ldots\}$ is a sequence of orthogonal functions of nonzero L^{2}-norms $\left\| f_n \right\| _2 = \sqrt{\langle f_n, f_n \rangle} = \left(\int f_n ^2 \ dx \right) ^\frac{1}{2}$. It follows that the sequence $\left\{ f_n / \left\| f_n \right\| _2 \right\}$ is of functions of L^{2}-norm one, forming an orthonormal sequence. To have a defined L^{2}-norm, the integral must be bounded, which restricts the functions to being square-integrable.

== Trigonometric functions ==
Several sets of orthogonal functions have become standard bases for approximating functions. For example, the sine functions sin nx and sin mx are orthogonal on the interval $x \in (-\pi, \pi)$ when $m \neq n$ and n and m are positive integers. For then
$$2 \sin \left(mx\right) \sin \left(nx\right) = \cos \left(\left(m - n\right)x\right) - \cos\left(\left(m+n\right) x\right),$$
and the integral of the product of the two sine functions vanishes. Together with cosine functions, these orthogonal functions may be assembled into a trigonometric polynomial to approximate a given function on the interval with its Fourier series.

== Polynomials ==
If one begins with the monomial sequence $\left\{1, x, x^2, \dots\right\}$ on the interval $[-1,1]$ and applies the Gram–Schmidt process, then one obtains the Legendre polynomials. Another collection of orthogonal polynomials are the associated Legendre polynomials.

The study of orthogonal polynomials involves weight functions $w(x)$ that are inserted in the bilinear form:
$$\langle f,g\rangle = \int w(x) f(x) g(x)\,dx  .$$
For Laguerre polynomials on $(0,\infty)$ the weight function is $w(x) = e^{-x}$.

Both physicists and probability theorists use Hermite polynomials on $(-\infty,\infty)$, where the weight function is $w(x) = e^{-x^2}$ or $w(x) = e^{- x^2/2}$.

Chebyshev polynomials are defined on $[-1,1]$ and use weights $w(x) = \frac{1}{\sqrt{1 - x^2}}$ or $w(x) = \sqrt{1 - x^2}$.

Zernike polynomials are defined on the unit disk and have orthogonality of both radial and angular parts.

== Binary-valued functions ==
Walsh functions and Haar wavelets are examples of orthogonal functions with discrete ranges.

== Rational functions ==
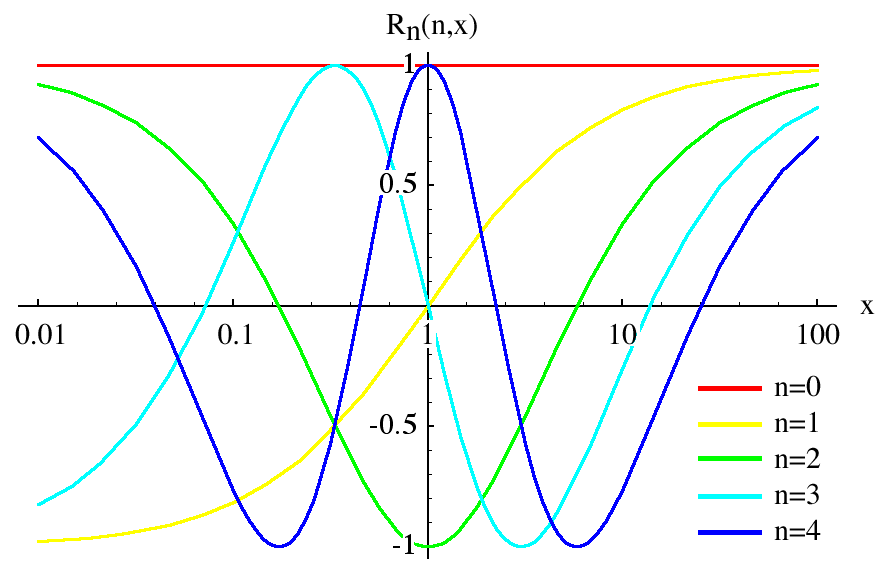
Plot of the Chebyshev rational functions of order n=0,1,2,3 and 4 between x=0.01 and 100.

Legendre and Chebyshev polynomials provide orthogonal families for the interval [−1, 1] while occasionally orthogonal families are required on [0, ∞). In this case it is convenient to apply the Cayley transform first, to bring the argument into [−1, 1]. This procedure results in families of rational orthogonal functions called Legendre rational functions and Chebyshev rational functions.

== In differential equations ==
Solutions of linear differential equations with boundary conditions can often be written as a weighted sum of orthogonal solution functions (a.k.a. eigenfunctions), leading to generalized Fourier series.

== See also ==
- Eigenvalues and eigenvectors
- Hilbert space
- Karhunen–Loève theorem
- Lauricella's theorem
- Wannier function
