= Legendre rational functions =

Type of function in mathematics

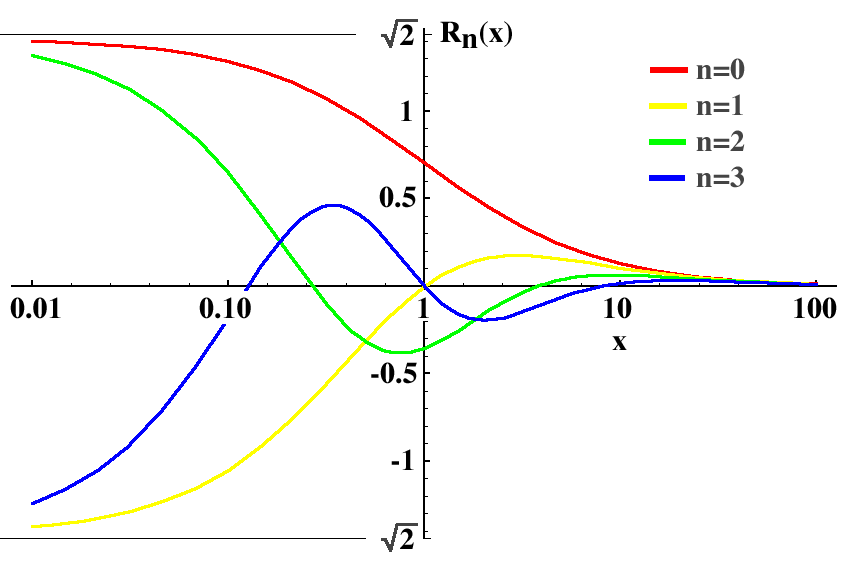
Plot of the Legendre rational functions for n=0,1,2 and 3 for x between 0.01 and 100.

In mathematics, the Legendre rational functions are a sequence of orthogonal functions on [0, ∞). They are obtained by composing the Cayley transform with Legendre polynomials.

A rational Legendre function of degree n is defined as:
$$R_n(x) = \frac{\sqrt{2}}{x+1}\,P_n\left(\frac{x-1}{x+1}\right)$$
where $P_n(x)$ is a Legendre polynomial. These functions are eigenfunctions of the singular Sturm–Liouville problem:
$$(x+1) \frac{d}{dx}\left(x \frac{d}{dx} \left[\left(x+1\right) v(x)\right]\right) + \lambda v(x) = 0$$
with eigenvalues
$$\lambda_n=n(n+1)\,$$

== Properties ==
Many properties can be derived from the properties of the Legendre polynomials of the first kind. Other properties are unique to the functions themselves.

=== Recursion ===
$$R_{n+1}(x)=\frac{2n+1}{n+1}\,\frac{x-1}{x+1}\,R_n(x)-\frac{n}{n+1}\,R_{n-1}(x)\quad\mathrm{for\,n\ge 1}$$
and
$$2 (2n+1) R_n(x) = \left(x+1\right)^2 \left(\frac{d}{dx} R_{n+1}(x) - \frac{d}{dx} R_{n-1}(x)\right) + (x+1) \left(R_{n+1}(x) - R_{n-1}(x)\right)$$

=== Limiting behavior ===
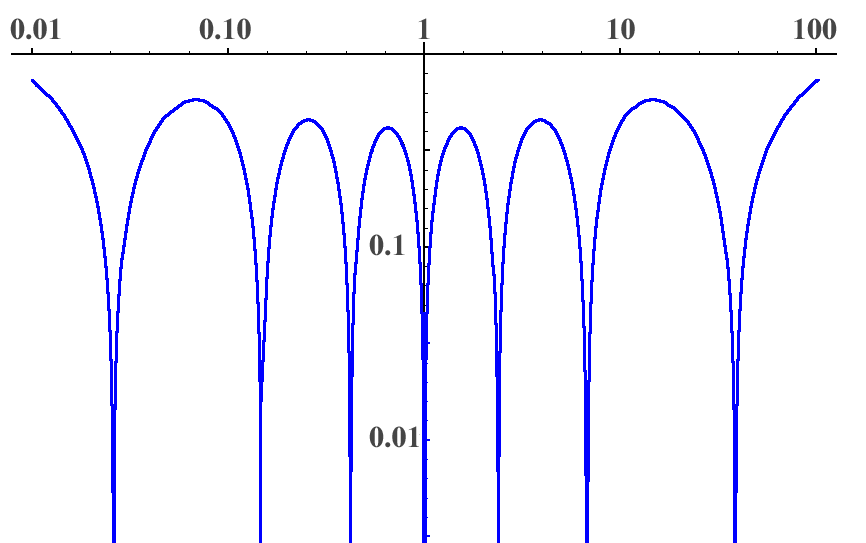
Plot of the seventh order (n=7) Legendre rational function multiplied by 1+x for x between 0.01 and 100. Note that there are n zeroes arranged symmetrically about x=1 and if x_{0} is a zero, then 1/x_{0} is a zero as well. These properties hold for all orders.

It can be shown that
$$\lim_{x\to\infty}(x+1)R_n(x)=\sqrt{2}$$
and
$$\lim_{x\to\infty}x\partial_x((x+1)R_n(x))=0$$

=== Orthogonality ===
$$\int_{0}^\infty R_m(x)\,R_n(x)\,dx=\frac{2}{2n+1}\delta_{nm}$$
where $\delta_{nm}$ is the Kronecker delta function.

== Particular values ==
$$\begin{align}
R_0(x) &= \frac{\sqrt{2}}{x+1}\,1 \\
R_1(x) &= \frac{\sqrt{2}}{x+1}\,\frac{x-1}{x+1} \\
R_2(x) &= \frac{\sqrt{2}}{x+1}\,\frac{x^2-4x+1}{(x+1)^2} \\
R_3(x) &= \frac{\sqrt{2}}{x+1}\,\frac{x^3-9x^2+9x-1}{(x+1)^3} \\
R_4(x) &= \frac{\sqrt{2}}{x+1}\,\frac{x^4-16x^3+36x^2-16x+1}{(x+1)^4}
\end{align}$$
