= Chebyshev rational functions =

Sequence of mathematical functions

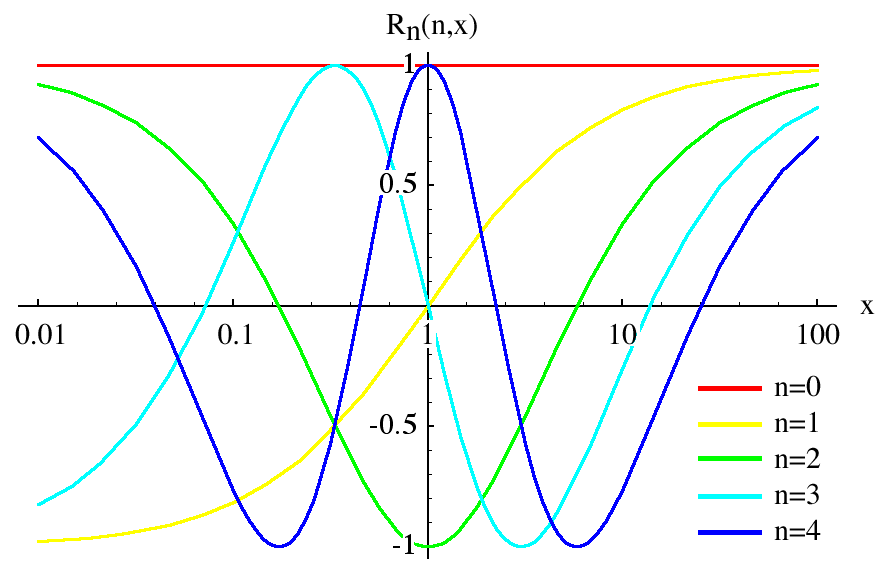
Plot of the Chebyshev rational functions for n = 0, 1, 2, 3, 4 for 0.01 ≤ x ≤ 100, log scale.

In mathematics, the Chebyshev rational functions are a sequence of functions which are both rational and orthogonal. They are named after Pafnuty Chebyshev. A rational Chebyshev function of degree n is defined as:

$$R_n(x)\ \stackrel{\mathrm{def}}{=}\  T_n\left(\frac{x-1}{x+1}\right)$$

where T_{n}(x) is a Chebyshev polynomial of the first kind.

== Properties ==
Many properties can be derived from the properties of the Chebyshev polynomials of the first kind. Other properties are unique to the functions themselves.

=== Recursion ===
$$R_{n+1}(x)=2\left(\frac{x-1}{x+1}\right)R_{n}(x)-R_{n-1}(x)\quad\text{for}\,n\ge 1$$

=== Differential equations ===
$$(x+1)^2R_n(x)=\frac{1}{n+1}\frac{\mathrm{d}}{\mathrm{d}x}R_{n+1}(x)-\frac{1}{n-1}\frac{\mathrm{d}}{\mathrm{d}x}R_{n-1}(x) \quad \text{for } n\ge 2$$

$$(x+1)^2x\frac{\mathrm{d}^2}{\mathrm{d}x^2}R_n(x)+\frac{(3x+1)(x+1)}{2}\frac{\mathrm{d}}{\mathrm{d}x}R_n(x)+n^2R_{n}(x) = 0$$

=== Orthogonality ===
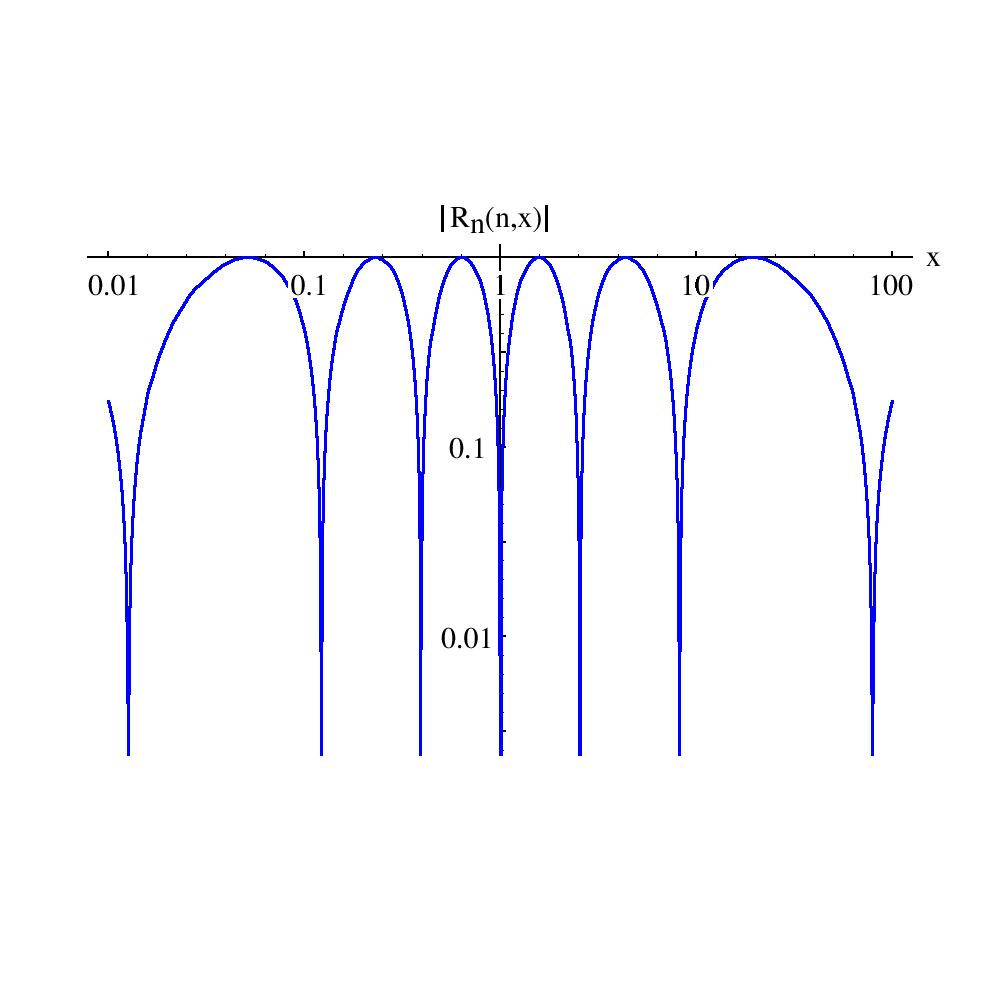
Plot of the absolute value of the seventh-order (n = 7) Chebyshev rational function for 0.01 ≤ x ≤ 100. Note that there are n zeroes arranged symmetrically about x = 1 and if x_{0} is a zero, then 1/x_{0} is a zero as well. The maximum value between the zeros is unity. These properties hold for all orders.

Defining:

$$\omega(x) \ \stackrel{\mathrm{def}}{=}\  \frac{1}{(x+1)\sqrt{x}}$$

The orthogonality of the Chebyshev rational functions may be written:

$$\int_{0}^\infty R_m(x)\,R_n(x)\,\omega(x)\,\mathrm{d}x=\frac{\pi c_n}{2}\delta_{nm}$$

where c_{n} = 2 for n = 0 and c_{n} = 1 for n ≥ 1; δ_{nm} is the Kronecker delta function.

=== Expansion of an arbitrary function ===
For an arbitrary function f(x) ∈ L^{2}_{ω} the orthogonality relationship can be used to expand f(x):

$$f(x)=\sum_{n=0}^\infty F_n R_n(x)$$

where

$$F_n=\frac{2}{c_n\pi}\int_{0}^\infty f(x)R_n(x)\omega(x)\,\mathrm{d}x.$$

== Particular values ==
$$\begin{align}
R_0(x)&=1\\
R_1(x)&=\frac{x-1}{x+1}\\
R_2(x)&=\frac{x^2-6x+1}{(x+1)^2}\\
R_3(x)&=\frac{x^3-15x^2+15x-1}{(x+1)^3}\\
R_4(x)&=\frac{x^4-28x^3+70x^2-28x+1}{(x+1)^4}\\
R_n(x)&=(x+1)^{-n}\sum_{m=0}^{n} (-1)^m\binom{2n}{2m}x^{n-m}
\end{align}$$

== Partial fraction expansion ==
$$R_n(x)=\sum_{m=0}^{n} \frac{(m!)^2}{(2m)!}\binom{n+m-1}{m}\binom{n}{m}\frac{(-4)^m}{(x+1)^m}$$
