= Ferrers function =

In mathematics, Ferrers functions are certain special functions defined in terms of hypergeometric functions. They are named after Norman Macleod Ferrers.

== Definitions ==
Define $\mu$ the order, and the $\nu$ degree are real, and assume $x \in (-1, +1)$.

Ferrers function of the first kind

$$P_v^\mu(x) = \left(\frac{1+x}{1-x}\right)^{\mu/2}\cdot\frac{{}_2F_1(v+1,-v;1-\mu;1/2-x/2)}{\Gamma(1-\mu)}$$

Ferrers function of the second kind

$$Q_v^\mu(x)= \frac{\pi}{2\sin(\mu\pi)}\left(\cos(\mu\pi)\left(\frac{1+x}{1-x}\right)^\frac{\mu}2\,\frac{{}_2F_1\left(v+1,-v;1-\mu;\frac{1-x}2\right)}{\Gamma(1-\mu)}-\frac{\Gamma(\nu+\mu+1)}{\Gamma(\nu-\mu+1)}\left(\frac{1-x}{1+x}\right)^\frac{\mu}2\,\frac{{}_2F_1\left(v+1,-v;1+\mu;\frac{1-x}2\right)}{\Gamma(1+\mu)}\right)$$

== See also ==
- Legendre function
