= Big q-Legendre polynomials =

In mathematics, the big q-Legendre polynomials are an orthogonal family of polynomials defined in terms of Heine's basic hypergeometric series as

$$\displaystyle   P_n(x;c;q)={}_3\phi_2(q^{-n},q^{n+1},x;q,cq;q,q)$$.

They obey the orthogonality relation

$$\int_{cq}^q P_m(x;c;q)P_n(x;c;q) \, dx=q(1-c)\frac{1-q}{1-q^{2n+1}}\frac{(c^{-1}q;q)_n}{(cq;q)_n}(-cq^2)^n q^{n \choose 2}\delta_{mn}$$

and have the limiting behavior

$$\displaystyle\lim_{q \to 1} P_n(x;0;q)=P_n(2x-1)$$

where $P_n$ is the $n$th Legendre polynomial.
