= Unevenly spaced time series =

In statistics, signal processing, and econometrics, an unevenly (or unequally or irregularly) spaced time series is a sequence of observation time and value pairs (t_{n}, X_{n}) in which the spacing of observation times is not constant.

Unevenly spaced time series naturally occur in many industrial and scientific domains: natural disasters such as earthquakes, floods, or volcanic eruptions typically occur at irregular time intervals. In observational astronomy, measurements such as spectra of celestial objects are taken at times determined by weather conditions, availability of observation time slots, and suitable planetary configurations. In clinical trials (or more generally, longitudinal studies), a patient's state of health may be observed only at irregular time intervals, and different patients are usually observed at different points in time. Wireless sensors in the Internet of things often transmit information only when a state changes to conserve battery life. There are many more examples in climatology, ecology, geology, and signal processing.

== Analysis ==
A common approach to analyzing unevenly spaced time series is to transform the data into equally spaced observations using some form of interpolation - most often linear - and then to apply existing methods for equally spaced data. However, transforming data in such a way can introduce a number of significant and hard to quantify biases, especially if the spacing of observations is highly irregular.

Ideally, unevenly spaced time series are analyzed in their unaltered form. However, most of the basic theory for time series analysis was developed at a time when limitations in computing resources favored an analysis of equally spaced data, since in this case efficient linear algebra routines can be used and many problems have an explicit solution. As a result, fewer methods currently exist specifically for analyzing unevenly spaced time series data.

The least-squares spectral analysis methods are commonly used for computing a frequency spectrum from such time series without any data alterations.

== Software ==
- Traces is a Python library for analysis of unevenly spaced time series in their unaltered form.
- CRAN Task View: Time Series Analysis is a list describing many R (programming language) packages dealing with both unevenly (or irregularly) and evenly spaced time series and many related aspects, including uncertainty.
- MessyTimeSeries and MessyTimeSeriesOptim are Julia packages dedicated to incomplete time series.

== See also ==
- Least-squares spectral analysis
- Non-uniform discrete Fourier transform
- Spacetime
