= Giuseppe Lauricella =

Italian mathematician (1867–1913)

- Born: December 15, 1867; Agrigento, Italy
- Died: 3 January 1913 (aged 45); Catania, Italy
- Education: University of Pisa
- Scientific career
- Fields: Mathematics
- Workplaces: University of Catania

Giuseppe Lauricella (15 December 1867 – 9 January 1913) was an Italian mathematician who contributed to analysis and theory of elasticity.

== Biography ==
Born in Agrigento (Sicily), Lauricella studied at the University of Pisa, where his professors included Luigi Bianchi, Ulisse Dini and Vito Volterra. He taught in secondary schools from 1895 to 1898, then became a professor at the University of Catania. In 1907 he became a member of the Accademia dei Lincei. He was an Invited Speaker of the ICM in 1908 in Rome.

Lauricella died in Catania at age 45 from a scarlet fever he contracted from one of his children.

== Contributions ==
- Lauricella hypergeometric series $F_A, F_B, F_C, F_D$
- Lauricella's theorem (regarding orthogonal functions)
