= Lauricella's theorem =

Orthogonal functions theorem

In the theory of orthogonal functions, Lauricella's theorem provides a condition for checking the closure of a set of orthogonal functions, namely:

Theorem – A necessary and sufficient condition that a normal orthogonal set $\{u_k\}$ be closed is that the formal series for each function of a known closed normal orthogonal set $\{v_k\}$ in terms of $\{u_k\}$ converge in the mean to that function.

The theorem was proved by Giuseppe Lauricella in 1912.
