= Cayley transform =

Mathematical operation

In mathematics, the Cayley transform, named after Arthur Cayley, is any of a cluster of related things. As originally described by Cayley (1846), the Cayley transform is a mapping between skew-symmetric matrices and special orthogonal matrices. The transform is a homography used in real analysis, complex analysis, and quaternionic analysis. In the theory of Hilbert spaces, the Cayley transform is a mapping between linear operators (Nikolski 1988).

== Real homography ==
A simple example of a Cayley transform can be done on the real projective line. The Cayley transform here will permute the elements of {1, 0, −1, ∞} in sequence. For example, it maps the positive real numbers to the interval [−1, 1]. Thus the Cayley transform is used to adapt Legendre polynomials for use with functions on the positive real numbers with Legendre rational functions.

As a real homography, points are described with projective coordinates, and the mapping is

$$[y,\ 1] = \left[\frac {x - 1}{x +1},\ 1\right] \thicksim [x - 1, \ x + 1] = [x,\ 1]\begin{pmatrix}1 & 1 \\ -1 & 1 \end{pmatrix} .$$

== Complex homography ==
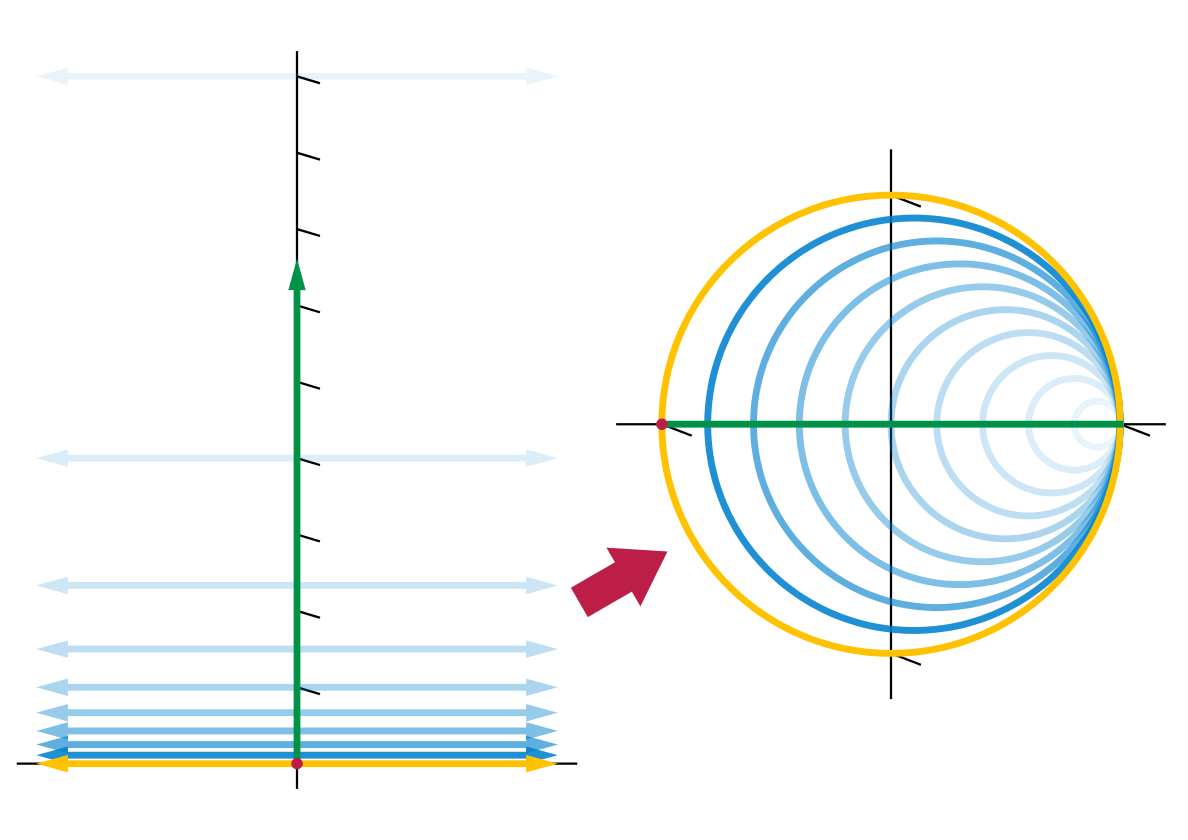
Cayley transform of upper complex half-plane to unit disk

On the upper half of the complex plane, the Cayley transform is:

$$f(z) = \frac {z - i}{z + i} .$$

Since $\{\infty, 1, -1\}$ is mapped to $\{1, -i, i\}$, and Möbius transformations permute the generalised circles in the complex plane, $f$ maps the real line to the unit circle. Furthermore, since $f$ is a homeomorphism and $i$ is taken to 0 by $f$, the upper half-plane is mapped to the unit disk.

In terms of the models of hyperbolic geometry, this Cayley transform relates the Poincaré half-plane model to the Poincaré disk model.

In electrical engineering the Cayley transform has been used to map a reactance half-plane to the Smith chart used for impedance matching of transmission lines.

== Quaternion homography ==
In the four-dimensional space of quaternions $a+b\vec{i}+c\vec{j}+d\vec{k}$, the versors

$u(\theta, r) = \cos \theta + r \sin \theta$ form the unit 3-sphere.

Since quaternions are non-commutative, elements of its projective line have homogeneous coordinates written $U[a,b]$ to indicate that the homogeneous factor multiplies on the left. The quaternion transform is

$$f(u,q) = U[q,1]\begin{pmatrix}1 & 1 \\ -u & u \end{pmatrix} = U[q - u,\ q + u] \sim U[(q + u)^{-1}(q - u),\ 1].$$

The real and complex homographies described above are instances of the quaternion homography where $\theta$ is zero or $\pi/2$, respectively. Evidently the transform takes $u\to 0\to -1$ and takes $-u \to \infty \to 1$.

Evaluating this homography at $q=1$ maps the versor $u$ into its axis:

$$f(u,1) =(1+u)^{-1}(1-u) = (1+u)^*(1-u)/ |1+u|^2.$$

But $|1+u|^2 = (1+u)(1+u^*) = 2 + 2 \cos \theta ,\quad \text{and}\quad (1+u^*)(1-u) = -2 r \sin \theta .$

Thus $f(u,1) = -r \frac {\sin \theta}{1 + \cos \theta} = -r \tan \frac{\theta}{2} .$

In this form the Cayley transform has been described as a rational parametrization of rotation: Let $t=\tan\phi/2$ in the complex number identity

$$e^{-i \varphi} = \frac{1 - ti}{1 + ti}$$

where the right hand side is the transform of $ti$ and the left hand side represents the rotation of the plane by negative $\phi$ radians.

=== Inverse ===
Let $u^* = \cos \theta - r \sin \theta = u^{-1} .$ Since

$$\begin{pmatrix} 1 & 1 \\ -u & u \end{pmatrix}\ \begin{pmatrix} 1 & -u^*  \\ 1 & u^* \end{pmatrix} \ = \ \begin{pmatrix} 2 & 0 \\ 0 & 2 \end{pmatrix} \ \sim \  \begin{pmatrix} 1 & 0 \\ 0 & 1 \end{pmatrix} \ ,$$

where the equivalence is in the projective linear group over quaternions, the inverse of $f(u,1)$ is

$$U[p,1] \begin{pmatrix} 1 & -u^* \\ 1 & u^* \end{pmatrix} \ = \ U[p+1,\ (1-p)u^*] \sim U[u(1-p)^{-1} (p+1), \ 1] .$$

Since homographies are bijections, $f^{-1} (u,1)$ maps the vector quaternions to the 3-sphere of versors. As versors represent rotations in 3-space, the homography $f^{-1}$ produces rotations from the ball in $\R^3$.

== Matrix map ==
Among n×n square matrices over the reals, with I the identity matrix, let A be any skew-symmetric matrix (so that A^{T} = −A).

Then I + A is invertible, and the Cayley transform

$$Q = (I - A)(I + A)^{-1} \,\!$$

produces an orthogonal matrix, Q (so that Q^{T}Q = I). The matrix multiplication in the definition of Q above is commutative, so Q can be alternatively defined as $Q = (I + A)^{-1}(I - A)$. In fact, Q must have determinant +1, so is special orthogonal.

Conversely, let Q be any orthogonal matrix which does not have −1 as an eigenvalue; then

$$A = (I - Q)(I + Q)^{-1} \,\!$$

is a skew-symmetric matrix. (See also: Involution.) The condition on Q automatically excludes matrices with determinant −1, but also excludes certain special orthogonal matrices.

However, any rotation (special orthogonal) matrix Q can be written as

$$Q = \bigl((I - A)(I + A)^{-1}\bigr)^2$$

for some skew-symmetric matrix A; more generally any orthogonal matrix Q can be written as

$$Q = E(I - A)(I + A)^{-1}$$

for some skew-symmetric matrix A and some diagonal matrix E with ±1 as entries.

A slightly different form is also seen, requiring different mappings in each direction,

$$\begin{align}
Q &= (I - A)^{-1}(I + A), \\[5mu]
A &= (Q - I)(Q + I)^{-1}.
\end{align}$$

The mappings may also be written with the order of the factors reversed; however, A always commutes with (μI ± A)^{−1}, so the reordering does not affect the definition.

=== Examples ===
In the 2×2 case, we have

$$\begin{bmatrix} 0 & \tan \frac{\theta}{2} \\ -\tan \frac{\theta}{2} & 0 \end{bmatrix}
\leftrightarrow
\begin{bmatrix} \cos \theta & -\sin \theta \\ \sin \theta & \cos \theta \end{bmatrix} .$$

The 180° rotation matrix, −I, is excluded, though it is the limit as tan ^{θ}/_{2} goes to infinity.

In the 3×3 case, we have

$$\begin{bmatrix} 0 & z & -y \\ -z & 0 & x \\ y & -x & 0 \end{bmatrix}
\leftrightarrow
\frac{1}{K}
\begin{bmatrix}
w^2+x^2-y^2-z^2 & 2 (x y-w z) & 2 (w y+x z) \\
2 (x y+w z) & w^2-x^2+y^2-z^2 & 2 (y z-w x) \\
2 (x z-w y) & 2 (w x+y z) & w^2-x^2-y^2+z^2
\end{bmatrix} ,$$

where K = w^{2} + x^{2} + y^{2} + z^{2}, and where w = 1. This we recognize as the rotation matrix corresponding to quaternion

$$w + \mathbf{i} x + \mathbf{j} y + \mathbf{k} z \,\!$$

(by a formula Cayley had published the year before), except scaled so that w = 1 instead of the usual scaling so that w^{2} + x^{2} + y^{2} + z^{2} = 1. Thus vector (x,y,z) is the unit axis of rotation scaled by tan ^{θ}/_{2}. Again excluded are 180° rotations, which in this case are all Q which are symmetric (so that Q^{T} = Q).

=== Other matrices ===
One can extend the mapping to complex matrices by substituting "unitary" for "orthogonal" and "skew-Hermitian" for "skew-symmetric", the difference being that the transpose (·^{T}) is replaced by the conjugate transpose (·^{H}). This is consistent with replacing the standard real inner product with the standard complex inner product. In fact, one may extend the definition further with choices of adjoint other than transpose or conjugate transpose.

Formally, the definition only requires some invertibility, so one can substitute for Q any matrix M whose eigenvalues do not include −1. For example,

$$\begin{bmatrix} 0 & -a & ab - c \\ 0 & 0 & -b \\ 0 & 0 & 0 \end{bmatrix}
\leftrightarrow
\begin{bmatrix} 1 & 2a & 2c \\ 0 & 1 & 2b \\ 0 & 0 & 1 \end{bmatrix} .$$

Note that A is skew-symmetric (respectively, skew-Hermitian) if and only if Q is orthogonal (respectively, unitary) with no eigenvalue −1.

== Operator map ==
An infinite-dimensional version of an inner product space is a Hilbert space, and one can no longer speak of matrices. However, matrices are merely representations of linear operators, and these can be used. So, generalizing both the matrix mapping and the complex plane mapping, one may define a Cayley transform of operators.

$$\begin{align}
U &{}= (A - \mathbf{i}I) (A + \mathbf{i}I)^{-1} \\
A &{}= \mathbf{i}(I + U) (I - U)^{-1}
\end{align}$$

Here the domain of U, dom U, is (A+iI) dom A. See self-adjoint operator for further details.

== See also ==
- Bilinear transform
- Extensions of symmetric operators
