= List of q-analogs =

This is a list of q-analogs in mathematics and related fields.

== Algebra ==
- Iwahori–Hecke algebra
- Quantum affine algebra
- Quantum enveloping algebra
- Quantum group

== Analysis ==
- Jackson integral
- q-derivative
- q-difference polynomial
- Quantum calculus

== Combinatorics ==
- LLT polynomial
- q-binomial coefficient
- q-Pochhammer symbol
- q-Vandermonde identity

== Orthogonal polynomials ==
- q-Bessel polynomials
- q-Charlier polynomials
- q-Hahn polynomials
- q-Jacobi polynomials:
  - Big q-Jacobi polynomials
  - Continuous q-Jacobi polynomials
  - Little q-Jacobi polynomials
- q-Krawtchouk polynomials
- q-Laguerre polynomials
- Continuous q-Legendre polynomials
- q-Meixner polynomials
- q-Meixner–Pollaczek polynomials
- q-Racah polynomials

== Probability and statistics ==
- Gaussian q-distribution
- q-exponential distribution
- q-Weibull distribution
- Tsallis q-Gaussian
- Tsallis entropy

== Special functions ==
- Basic hypergeometric series
- Elliptic gamma function
- Hahn–Exton q-Bessel function
- Jackson q-Bessel function
- q-exponential
- q-gamma function
- q-theta function

== See also ==
- Lists of mathematics topics
