= List of things named after Carl Gustav Jacob Jacobi =

These are things named after Carl Gustav Jacob Jacobi (1804–1851), a German mathematician.

== Jacobi ==
- Abel–Jacobi theorem, a statement about the Jacobian variety of a curve
- Abel–Jacobi–Liouville identity
- Carathéodory–Jacobi–Lie theorem
- Desnanot–Jacobi identity
- Euler–Jacobi pseudoprime
- Euler–Jacobi problem
- Gauss–Jacobi quadrature
- Hamilton–Jacobi equation
- Hamilton–Jacobi–Bellman equation
- Hamilton–Jacobi–Einstein equation
- Hamilton–Jacobi–Isaacs equation
- Ivory–Jacobi formula
- Jacobi–Lie bracket
- Jacobi–Anger expansion
- Jacobi–Perron algorithm
- Jacobi−Trudi identities
- Jacobi conformal projections
- Jacobi coordinates
- Jacobi eigenvalue algorithm
- Jacobi ellipsoid
- Jacobi elliptic functions
- Jacobi field
- Jacobi's four-square theorem
- Jacobi form
- Jacobi's formula
- Jacobi group
- Jacobian ideal
- Jacobi identity
- Jacobi integral
- Jacobi's logarithm
- Jacobi method
  - Jacobi method for complex Hermitian matrices
- Jacobi multiplier
- Jacobi operator
- Jacobi polynomials
  - Continuous q-Jacobi polynomials
  - Big q-Jacobi polynomials
  - Little q-Jacobi polynomials
  - Pseudo Jacobi polynomials
  - Sieved Jacobi polynomials
- Jacobi preconditioner
- Jacobi rotation
- Jacobi set
- Jacobi sum
- Jacobi symbol
- Jacobi theta function
  - Jacobi zeta function
- Jacobi's theorem (skew-symmetric matrix)
- Jacobi transform
- Jacobi triple product
- Jacobi-type J-fractions
- Last geometric statement of Jacobi

== Jacobian ==
- Generalized Jacobian
- Intermediate Jacobian
- Jacobian conjecture
- Jacobian curve
- Jacobian matrix and determinant
- Jacobian variety
