= Q-Krawtchouk polynomials =

In mathematics, the q-Krawtchouk polynomials are a family of basic hypergeometric orthogonal polynomials in the basic Askey scheme Roelof Koekoek, Peter A. Lesky, and René F. Swarttouw (2010, 14). give a detailed list of their properties.

Stanton (1981) showed that the q-Krawtchouk polynomials are spherical functions for 3 different Chevalley groups over finite fields, and Koornwinder et al. (2010–2022) showed that they are related to representations of the quantum group SU(2).

== Definition ==
The polynomials are given in terms of basic hypergeometric functions by

$$K_n(q^{-x};p,N;q)={}_3\phi_2\left[\begin{matrix}
q^{-n},q^{-x},-pq^n\\
q^{-N},0\end{matrix}
;q,q\right],\quad n=0,1,2,...,N.$$

== See also ==
- affine q-Krawtchouk polynomials
- dual q-Krawtchouk polynomials
- quantum q-Krawtchouk polynomials

== Sources ==
- Gasper, George; Rahman, Mizan (2004), Basic hypergeometric series, Encyclopedia of Mathematics and its Applications, vol. 96 (2nd ed.), Cambridge University Press, ISBN 978-0-521-83357-8, MR 2128719
- Koekoek, Roelof; Lesky, Peter A.; Swarttouw, René F. (2010), Hypergeometric orthogonal polynomials and their q-analogues, Springer Monographs in Mathematics, Berlin, New York: Springer-Verlag, doi:10.1007/978-3-642-05014-5, ISBN 978-3-642-05013-8, MR 2656096
- Koornwinder, Tom H.; Wong, Roderick S. C.; Koekoek, Roelof; Swarttouw, René F. (2010–2022), "Chapter 18 Orthogonal Polynomials", in Olver, Frank W. J.; Lozier, Daniel M.; Boisvert, Ronald F.; Clark, Charles W. (eds.), NIST Handbook of Mathematical Functions, Cambridge University Press, ISBN 978-0-521-19225-5, MR 2723248
- Sadjang, Patrick Njionou (n.d.). Moments of Classical Orthogonal Polynomials (Ph.D. thesis). Universität Kassel.
- Stanton, Dennis (1981), "Three addition theorems for some q-Krawtchouk polynomials", Geometriae Dedicata, 10 (1): 403–425, doi:10.1007/BF01447435, ISSN 0046-5755, MR 0608153, S2CID 119838893
