= List of things named after Charles Hermite =

Numerous things are named after the French mathematician Charles Hermite (1822–1901):

== Hermite ==
- Cubic Hermite spline, a type of third-degree spline
- Gauss–Hermite quadrature, an extension of Gaussian quadrature method
- Hermite class
- Hermite differential equation
- Hermite distribution, a parametrized family of discrete probability distributions
- Hermite–Lindemann theorem, theorem about transcendental numbers
- Hermite constant, a constant related to the geometry of certain lattices
- Hermite-Gaussian modes
- The Hermite–Hadamard inequality on convex functions and their integrals
- Hermite interpolation, a method of interpolating data points by a polynomial
- Hermite–Kronecker–Brioschi characterization
- The Hermite–Minkowski theorem, stating that only finitely many number fields have small discriminants
- Hermite normal form, a form of row-reduced matrices
- Hermite numbers, integers related to the Hermite polynomials
- Hermite polynomials, a sequence of polynomials orthogonal with respect to the normal distribution
  - Continuous q-Hermite polynomials
  - Continuous big q-Hermite polynomials
  - Discrete q-Hermite polynomials
  - Wiener–Hermite expansion
- Hermite reciprocity, a reciprocity law concerning covariants of binary forms
- Hermite ring, a ring over which every stably free module is free of unique rank
- Hermite-Sobolev spaces

== Hermite's ==
- Hermite's cotangent identity, a trigonometric identity
- Hermite's criterion
- Hermite's identity, an identity on fractional parts of integer multiples of real numbers
- Hermite's problem, an unsolved problem on certain ways of expressing real numbers
- Hermite's theorem, that there are only finitely many algebraic number fields of discriminant less than a given magnitude

== Hermitian ==
- Einstein–Hermitian vector bundle
  - Deformed Hermitian Yang–Mills equation
- Hermitian adjoint
- Hermitian connection, the unique connection on a Hermitian manifold that satisfies specific conditions
- Hermitian form, a specific sesquilinear form
- Hermitian function, a complex function whose complex conjugate is equal to the original function with the variable changed in sign
- Hermitian manifold/structure
  - Hermitian metric, is a smoothly varying positive-definite Hermitian form on each fiber of a complex vector bundle
- Hermitian matrix, a square matrix with complex entries that is equal to its own conjugate transpose
  - Skew-Hermitian matrix
- Hermitian operator, an operator (sometimes a symmetric operator, sometimes a symmetric densely defined operator, sometimes a self-adjoint operator)
- Hermitian polynomials, a classical orthogonal polynomial sequence that arise in probability
- Hermitian symmetric space, a Kähler manifold which, as a Riemannian manifold, is a Riemannian symmetric space
- Hermitian transpose, the transpose of a matrix and with the complex conjugate of each entry
- Hermitian variety, a generalisation of quadrics
- Hermitian wavelet, a family of continuous wavelets
- Non-Hermitian quantum mechanics

== Astronomical objects ==
- 24998 Hermite, a main-belt asteroid
- Hermite (crater)
