= Q-Jacobi polynomials =

In mathematics, the q-Jacobi polynomials may be the

- Big q-Jacobi polynomials
- Continuous q-Jacobi polynomials
- Little q-Jacobi polynomials
