= Askey scheme =

Classification of orthogonal polynomials

In mathematics, the Askey scheme is a way of organizing orthogonal polynomials of hypergeometric or basic hypergeometric type into a hierarchy. For the classical orthogonal polynomials discussed in Andrews & Askey (1985), the Askey scheme was first drawn by Labelle (1985) and by Askey and Wilson (1985), and has since been extended by Koekoek & Swarttouw (1998) and Koekoek, Lesky & Swarttouw (2010) to cover basic orthogonal polynomials.

== Askey scheme for hypergeometric orthogonal polynomials ==
Koekoek, Lesky & Swarttouw (2010) give the following version of the Askey scheme:

${}_4F_3(4)$
Wilson | Racah
${}_3F_2(3)$
Continuous dual Hahn | Continuous Hahn | Hahn | dual Hahn
${}_2F_1(2)$
Meixner–Pollaczek | Jacobi | Pseudo Jacobi | Meixner | Krawtchouk
${}_2F_0(1)\ \ / \ \ {}_1F_1(1)$
Laguerre | Bessel | Charlier
${}_2F_0(0)$
Hermite

Here ${}_pF_q(n)$ indicates a hypergeometric series representation with $n$ parameters

== Askey scheme for basic hypergeometric orthogonal polynomials ==
Koekoek, Lesky & Swarttouw (2010) give the following scheme for basic hypergeometric orthogonal polynomials:

_{4}$\phi$_{3}
Askey–Wilson | q-Racah
_{3}$\phi$_{2}
Continuous dual q-Hahn | Continuous q-Hahn | Big q-Jacobi | q-Hahn | dual q-Hahn
_{2}$\phi$_{1}
Al-Salam–Chihara | q-Meixner–Pollaczek | Continuous q-Jacobi | Big q-Laguerre | Little q-Jacobi | q-Meixner | Quantum q-Krawtchouk | q-Krawtchouk | Affine q-Krawtchouk | Dual q-Krawtchouk
_{2}$\phi$_{0}/_{1}$\phi$_{1}
Continuous big q-Hermite | Continuous q-Laguerre | Little q-Laguerre | q-Laguerre | q-Bessel | q-Charlier | Al-Salam–Carlitz I | Al-Salam–Carlitz II
_{1}$\phi$_{0}
Continuous q-Hermite | Stieltjes–Wigert | Discrete q-Hermite I | Discrete q-Hermite II

== Completeness ==
While there are several approaches to constructing still more general families of orthogonal polynomials, it is usually not possible to extend the Askey scheme by reusing hypergeometric functions of the same form. For instance, one might naively hope to find new examples given by

$$p_n(x) = {}_{q + 1}F_q \left ( \begin{array}{c} -n, n + \mu, a_1(x), \dots, a_{q - 1}(x) \\ b_1, \dots, b_q \end{array} ; 1 \right )$$

above $q = 3$ which corresponds to the Wilson polynomials. This was ruled out in Cheikh, Lamiri & Ouni (2009) under the assumption that the $a_i(x)$ are degree 1 polynomials such that

$$\prod_{i = 1}^{q - 1} (a_i(x) + r) = \prod_{i = 1}^{q - 1} a_i(x) + \pi(r)$$

for some polynomial $\pi(r)$.
