= Big q-Laguerre polynomials =

In mathematics, the big q-Laguerre polynomials are a family of basic hypergeometric orthogonal polynomials in the basic Askey scheme. Roelof Koekoek, Peter A. Lesky, and René F. Swarttouw (2010, 14) have given a detailed list of their properties.

== Definition ==
The polynomials are given in terms of basic hypergeometric functions and the q-Pochhammer symbol by

$P_n(x;a,b;q)=\frac{1}{(b^{-1}q^{-n};q)_n}{}_2\phi_1\left(q^{-n},aqx^{-1};aq;q,\frac{x}{b}\right)$

== Relation to other polynomials ==
Big q-Laguerre polynomials→Laguerre polynomials
