= Hahn polynomials =

Family of orthogonal polynomials

In mathematics, Hahn polynomials are a family of orthogonal polynomials in the Askey scheme of hypergeometric orthogonal polynomials, introduced by Pafnuty Chebyshev and rediscovered by Wolfgang Hahn. The Hahn class is a name for special cases of Hahn polynomials, such as Meixner polynomials, Krawtchouk polynomials, and Charlier polynomials. Sometimes the Hahn class is taken to include limiting cases of these polynomials, in which case it also includes the classical orthogonal polynomials.

Hahn polynomials are defined in terms of generalized hypergeometric functions by

$$Q_n(x;\alpha,\beta,N)= {}_3F_2(-n,-x,n+\alpha+\beta+1;\alpha+1,-N+1;1)$$

for $n=0,1,\dots,N$. If $\alpha = \beta = 0$, these polynomials are identical to the discrete Chebyshev polynomials up to a scale factor.

Hahn polynomials have dual, continuous and continuous dual versions. These polynomials all have q-analogs. Hahn polynomials are a limiting case of Racah polynomials.

== Properties ==
=== Orthogonality ===
Hahn polynomials satisfy the orthogonality relations

$$\sum_{x=0}^{N-1} Q_n(x)Q_m(x)\rho(x)=\frac{1}{\pi_n}\delta_{m,n},\quad \sum_{n=0}^{N-1}Q_n(x)Q_n(y)\pi_n=\frac{1}{\rho(x)}\delta_{x,y},$$

where $\delta_{x,y}$ is the Kronecker delta and the weight functions are

$$\rho(x;\alpha;\beta,N)=\binom{\alpha+x}{x}\binom{\beta+N-1-x}{N-1-x}\bigg/\binom{N+\alpha+\beta}{N-1}$$

and

$$\pi_n(\alpha,\beta,N)=\binom{N-1}{n}\frac{2n+\alpha+\beta+1}{\alpha+\beta+1}
\frac{\Gamma(\beta+1,n+\alpha+1,n+\alpha+\beta+1)}{\Gamma(\alpha+1,\alpha+\beta+1,n+\beta+1,n+1)}\bigg/\binom{N+\alpha+\beta+n}{n}.$$

== Dual version ==
Hahn polynomials have a dual version, the dual Hahn polynomials, which are also a family of orthogonal polynomials in the Askey scheme of hypergeometric orthogonal polynomials. They are defined on a non-uniform lattice $x(s)=s(s+1)$ by

$$w_n^{(c)} (s,a,b)=\frac{(a-b+1)_n(a+c+1)_n}{n!}\cdot {}_3F_2\left( \begin{array}{c} -n\;\quad a-s\;\quad a+s+1 \\ -b\;\quad a+c+1 \end{array} ;1\right)$$

for $n=0,1,...,N-1$, and the parameters $a,b,c$ are restricted to

$$-\frac{1}{2}<a<b,\quad |c|<1+a,\quad b=a+N.$$

Here $(u)_k$ is the rising factorial, and ${}_3F_2$ is a generalized hypergeometric function.

Roelof Koekoek, Peter A. Lesky, and René F. Swarttouw (2010, 14) give a detailed list of their properties.

=== Orthogonality ===
The dual Hahn polynomials satisfy the orthogonality condition

$$\sum^{b-1}_{s=a}w_n^{(c)}(s,a,b)w_m^{(c)}(s,a,b)\rho(s)\Delta x\Big(s-\frac{1}{2}\Big)=\delta_{nm}d_n^2$$

for $n,m=0,1,...,N-1$, where $\Delta x(s)=x(s+1)-x(s)$,

$$\rho(s)=\frac{\Gamma(a+s+1)\Gamma(c+s+1)}{\Gamma(s-a+1)\Gamma(b-s)\Gamma(b+s+1)\Gamma(s-c+1)}$$

and

$$d_n^2=\frac{\Gamma(a+c+n+a)}{n!(b-a-n-1)!\Gamma(b-c-n)}.$$

=== Numerical instability ===
As $n$ increases, the values that the discrete polynomials attain increase. As a result, obtaining numerical stability in calculating the polynomials requires the use of renormalized dual Hahn polynomials, defined as

$$\hat w_n^{(c)}(s,a,b)=w_n^{(c)}(s,a,b)\sqrt{\frac{\rho(s)}{d_n^2}\Delta x\Big(s-\frac{1}{2}\Big)}$$

for $n=0,1,...,N-1$. Here the orthogonality condition becomes

$$\sum^{b-1}_{s=a}\hat w_n^{(c)}(s,a,b)\hat w_m^{(c)}(s,a,b)=\delta_{m,n}$$

for $n,m=0,1,...,N-1.$

== Continuous version ==
Hahn polynomials have a continuous version, the continuous Hahn polynomials, which are also a family of orthogonal polynomials in the Askey scheme of hypergeometric orthogonal polynomials. They are defined in terms of generalized hypergeometric functions by

$$p_n(x;a,b,c,d)= i^n\frac{(a+c)_n(a+d)_n}{n!} \cdot {}_3F_2\left( \begin{array}{c} -n\;\quad n+a+b+c+d-1\;\quad a+ix \\ a+c\;\quad a+d \end{array} ; 1\right)$$

Roelof Koekoek, Peter A. Lesky, and René F. Swarttouw (2010, 14) give a detailed list of their properties.

=== Orthogonality ===
The continuous Hahn polynomials are orthogonal with respect to the weight function

$$w(x)=\Gamma(a+ix)\,\Gamma(b+ix)\,\Gamma(c-ix)\,\Gamma(d-ix).$$

In particular, they satisfy the orthogonality relation

$$\begin{align}&\frac{1}{2\pi}\int_{-\infty}^{\infty}\Gamma(a+ix)\,\Gamma(b+ix)\,\Gamma(c-ix)\,\Gamma(d-ix)\,p_m(x;a,b,c,d)\,p_n(x;a,b,c,d)\,dx\\
&\qquad\qquad=\frac{\Gamma(n+a+c)\,\Gamma(n+a+d)\,\Gamma(n+b+c)\,\Gamma(n+b+d)}{n!(2n+a+b+c+d-1)\,\Gamma(n+a+b+c+d-1)}\,\delta_{n m}\end{align}$$

for $\Re(a)>0$, $\Re(b)>0$, $\Re(c)>0$, $\Re(d)>0$, $c = \overline{a}$, $d = \overline{b}$.

=== Recurrence and difference relations ===
The sequence of continuous Hahn polynomials satisfies the recurrence relation

$$(a+ix)\tilde{p}_n(x)=A_n\tilde{p}_{n+1}(x) - (A_n+C_n)\tilde{p}_{n}(x) + C_n\tilde{p}_{n-1}(x),$$

where

$$\begin{align}
&\tilde{p}_n(x)=\tilde{p}_n(x;a,b,c,d)=\frac{n!}{i^n(a+c)_n(a+d)_n}p_n(x;a,b,c,d),\\[6pt]
&A_n=\frac{-(n+a+b+c+d-1)(n+a+c)(n+a+d)}{(2n+a+b+c+d-1)(2n+a+b+c+d)}, \end{align}$$

and

$$C_n=\frac{n(n+b+c-1)(n+b+d-1)}{(2n+a+b+c+d-2)(2n+a+b+c+d-1)}.$$

=== Rodrigues formula ===
The continuous Hahn polynomials are given by the Rodrigues-type formula

$$\begin{align}&\Gamma(a+ix)\,\Gamma(b+ix)\,\Gamma(c-ix)\,\Gamma(d-ix)\,p_n(x;a,b,c,d)\\[5pt]
&\quad=\frac{(-1)^n}{n!}\frac{d^n}{dx^n}\left(\Gamma\left(a+\frac{n}{2}+ix\right)\,\Gamma\left(b+\frac{n}{2}+ix\right)\,\Gamma\left(c+\frac{n}{2}-ix\right)\,\Gamma\left(d+\frac{n}{2}-ix\right)\right).\end{align}$$

=== Generating functions ===
The continuous Hahn polynomials have the following generating function:

$$\begin{align} &\sum_{n=0}^{\infty}\frac{\Gamma(n+a+b+c+d)\,\Gamma(a+c+1)\,\Gamma(a+d+1)}{\Gamma(a+b+c+d)\,\Gamma(n+a+c+1)\,\Gamma(n+a+d+1)}(-it)^n p_n(x;a,b,c,d)\\[4pt]
&\qquad=(1-t)^{1-a-b-c-d}{}_3F_2\left( \begin{array}{c} \frac12(a+b+c+d-1), \frac12(a+b+c+d), a+ix\\ a+c, a+d\end{array} ; \frac{-4t}{(1-t)^2} \right).\end{align}$$

A second, distinct generating function is given by

$$\sum_{n=0}^{\infty}\frac{\Gamma(a+c+1)\,\Gamma(b+d+1)}{\Gamma(n+a+c+1)\,\Gamma(n+b+d+1)}t^n p_n(x;a,b,c,d)=\,_1F_1\left( \begin{array}{c} a + ix \\ a + c\end{array} ; -it\right)\,_1F_1\left( \begin{array}{c} d - ix \\ b + d\end{array} ; it\right).$$

=== Relation to other polynomials ===
Wilson polynomials are a generalization of the continuous Hahn polynomials.

Bateman polynomials $F_n(x)$ are related to the special case $a=b=c=d=1/2$ of the continuous Hahn polynomials by

$$p_n\left(x;\tfrac12,\tfrac12,\tfrac12,\tfrac12\right) = i^n n!F_n\left(2ix\right).$$

Jacobi polynomials $P_n^{(\alpha,\beta)}(x)$ can be obtained as a limiting case of the continuous Hahn polynomials:

$$P_n^{(\alpha,\beta)}=\lim_{t\to\infty}t^{-n}p_n\left(\tfrac12xt; \tfrac12(\alpha+1-it), \tfrac12(\beta+1+it), \tfrac12(\alpha+1+it), \tfrac12(\beta+1-it)\right).$$

== Continuous dual Hahn polynomials ==
In mathematics, the continuous dual Hahn polynomials are a family of orthogonal polynomials in the Askey scheme of hypergeometric orthogonal polynomials. They are defined in terms of generalized hypergeometric functions by

Continuous Dual Hahn polynomials

$$S_n(x^2;a,b,c)= {}_3F_2(-n,a+ix,a-ix;a+b,a+c;1).\$$

Continuous Dual Hahn Polynomials, complex3d plot

Roelof Koekoek, Peter A. Lesky, and René F. Swarttouw (2010, 14) give a detailed list of their properties.

Closely related polynomials include the dual Hahn polynomials R_{n}(x;γ,δ,N), the continuous Hahn polynomials p_{n}(x,a,b, a̅, b̅), and the Hahn polynomials. These polynomials all have q-analogs with an extra parameter q, such as the q-Hahn polynomials Q_{n}(x;α,β, N;q), and so on.

=== Relation of continuous dual Hahn polynomials to other polynomials ===
- Wilson polynomials are a generalization of continuous dual Hahn polynomials

== q-Hahn polynomials ==
In mathematics, the q-Hahn polynomials are a family of basic hypergeometric orthogonal polynomials in the basic Askey scheme. Roelof Koekoek, Peter A. Lesky, and René F. Swarttouw (2010, 14) give a detailed list of their properties.

=== Definition ===
The polynomials are given in terms of basic hypergeometric functions by

$$Q_n(q^{-x};a,b,N;q)={}_3\phi_2\left[\begin{matrix}
q^{-n},abq^{n+1},q^{-x}\\
aq,q^{-N}\end{matrix}
;q,q\right].$$

=== Dual q-Hahn polynomials ===
In mathematics, the dual q-Hahn polynomials are a family of basic hypergeometric orthogonal polynomials in the basic Askey scheme. Roelof Koekoek, Peter A. Lesky, and René F. Swarttouw (2010, 14) give a detailed list of their properties.

==== Definition ====
The polynomials are given in terms of basic hypergeometric functions.
$$R_n(q^{-x}+\gamma\delta q^{x+1},\gamma,\delta,N|q)={}_3\phi_2\left[\begin{matrix}
q^{-n},q^{-x},\gamma\delta q^{x+1}\\
\gamma q,q^{-N}\end{matrix}
;q,q\right],\quad n=0,1,2,...,N$$

=== Continuous q-Hahn polynomials ===
In mathematics, the continuous q-Hahn polynomials are a family of basic hypergeometric orthogonal polynomials in the basic Askey scheme. Roelof Koekoek, Peter A. Lesky, and René F. Swarttouw (2010, 14) give a detailed list of their properties.

==== Definition ====
The polynomials are given in terms of basic hypergeometric functions and the q-Pochhammer symbol by

$$p_n(x;a,b,c,d|q)=a^{-n}e^{-inu}(abe^{2iu},ac,ad;q)_n{}_4\phi_3(q^{-n},abcdq^{n-1},ae^{i{(t+2u)}},ae^{-it};abe^{2iu},ac,ad;q;q)$$

$x=\cos(t+u)$

==== Gallery ====
CONTINUOUS q hahn ABS COMPLEX3D Maple PLOT

CONTINUOUS q hahn IIM COMPLEX3D Maple PLOT

CONTINUOUS q hahn RE COMPLEX3D Maple PLOT

CONTINUOUS q hahn ABS density Maple PLOT

CONTINUOUS q hahn im density Maple PLOT

CONTINUOUS q hahn RE density Maple PLOT

=== Relation of q-Hahn polynomials to other polynomials ===
q-Hahn polynomials→ Quantum q-Krawtchouk polynomials：

$\lim_{a \to \infty}Q_{n}(q^{-x};a;p,N|q)=K_{n}^{qtm}(q^{-x};p,N;q)$

q-Hahn polynomials→ Hahn polynomials

make the substitution$\alpha=q^{\alpha}$,$\beta=q^{\beta}$ into definition of q-Hahn polynomials, and find the limit q→1, we obtain

${}_3F_2(-n,\alpha+\beta+n+1,-x,\alpha+1,-N,1)$，which is exactly Hahn polynomials.

=== Continuous dual q-Hahn polynomials ===
In mathematics, the continuous dual q-Hahn polynomials are a family of basic hypergeometric orthogonal polynomials in the basic Askey scheme. Roelof Koekoek, Peter A. Lesky, and René F. Swarttouw (2010, 14) give a detailed list of their properties.

==== Definition ====
The polynomials are given in terms of basic hypergeometric functions and the q-Pochhammer symbol by

$$p_n(x;a,b,c\mid q)=\frac{(ab,ac;q)_n}{a^n}{_3\phi_2}(q^{-n},ae^{i\theta},ae^{-i\theta}; ab, ac \mid q;q)$$

In which $x=\cos(\theta)$

== Relation of Hahn polynomials to other polynomials ==
- Racah polynomials are a generalization of Hahn polynomials
