= Continuous q-Laguerre polynomials =

In mathematics, the continuous q-Laguerre polynomials are a family of basic hypergeometric orthogonal polynomials in the basic Askey scheme. Roelof Koekoek, Peter A. Lesky, and René F. Swarttouw (2010, 14) give a detailed list of their properties.

== Definition ==
The polynomials are given in terms of basic hypergeometric functions and the q-Pochhammer symbol by 。

$P_{n}^{(\alpha)}(x|q)=\frac{(q^{\alpha+1};q)_{n}}{(q;q)_{n}}$$_{3}\phi_{2}(q^{-n},q^{\alpha/2+1/4}e^{i\theta},q^{\alpha/2+1/4}e^{-i\theta};q^{\alpha+1},0|q,q)$
