= Continuous q-Legendre polynomials =

In mathematics, the continuous q-Legendre polynomials are a family of basic hypergeometric orthogonal polynomials in the basic Askey scheme. Koekoek, Lesky & Swarttouw (2010) give a detailed list of their properties.

== Definition ==
The polynomials are given in terms of basic hypergeometric functions by

$$P_{n}(x|q)={}_4\phi_3\left(q^{-n},q^{n+1},q^{\frac14}e^{i\theta},q^{\frac14}e^{-i\theta};q,-q^{-\frac12},-q;q,q\right),\quad x=\cos\,\theta.$$
