= Q-Bessel polynomials =

In mathematics, the q-Bessel polynomials are a family of basic hypergeometric orthogonal polynomials in the basic Askey scheme. Roelof Koekoek, Peter A. Lesky, and René F. Swarttouw (2010, 14) give a detailed list of their properties.

== Definition ==
The polynomials are given in terms of basic hypergeometric functions by ：

$$y_{n}(x;a;q)=\;{}_2\phi_1 \left(\begin{matrix}
q^{-n} & -aq^{n} \\
0  \end{matrix}
; q,qx \right).$$

Also known as alternative q-Charlier polynomials $K(x;a;q).$

== Orthogonality ==
$\sum_{k=0}^{\infty}\left(\frac{a^k}{(q;q)_n}*q^{k+1 \choose 2}*y_{m}*(q^k;a;q)*y_{n}*(q^k;a;q)\right)=(q;q)_{n}*(-aq^n;q)_{\infty}\frac{ a^{n}*q^{n+1 \choose 2} }{1+aq^{2n}}\delta_{mn}$

where $(q;q)_n\text{ and }(-aq^n;q)_\infty$ are q-Pochhammer symbols.

== Gallery ==
QBessel function abs complex 3D Maple plot

QBessel function Im complex 3D Maple plot

QBessel function Re complex 3D Maple plot

QBessel function abs density Maple plot

QBessel function Im density Maple plot

QBessel function Re density Maple plot
