= Affine q-Krawtchouk polynomials =

In mathematics, the affine q-Krawtchouk polynomials are a family of basic hypergeometric orthogonal polynomials in the basic Askey scheme, introduced by Carlitz and Hodges. Roelof Koekoek, Peter A. Lesky, and René F. Swarttouw (2010, 14) give a detailed list of their properties.

== Definition ==
The polynomials are given in terms of basic hypergeometric functions by

$$K^{\text{aff}}_n (q^{-x};p;N;q) = {}_3\phi_2\left( \begin{matrix}
q^{-n},0,q^{-x}\\
pq,q^{-N}\end{matrix};q,q\right), \qquad n=0,1,2,\ldots, N.$$

== Relation to other polynomials ==
affine q-Krawtchouk polynomials → little q-Laguerre polynomials：

$$\lim_{a \to 1}=K_n^\text{aff}(q^{x-N};p,N\mid q)=p_n(q^x;p,q)$$.
