= Meixner =

Meixner is a surname. Notable people with the surname include:

- Josef Meixner (1908–1994), German theoretical physicist
- Josef Meixner (sport shooter) (born 1939), Austrian former sports shooter
- Karl Meixner (1903–1976), Austrian film actor
- Ronny Meixner (born 1964), German racing driver

== See also ==
- Meixner polynomials, are a family of discrete orthogonal polynomials introduced by Josef Meixner
- Meixner–Pollaczek polynomials, are a family of orthogonal polynomials P(λ) n(x,φ) introduced by Meixner
- Q-Meixner polynomials, are a family of basic hypergeometric orthogonal polynomials in the basic Askey scheme
- Q-Meixner–Pollaczek polynomials (not to be confused with q-Meixner polynomials) are a family of basic hypergeometric orthogonal polynomials in the basic Askey scheme.
