= Little q-Laguerre polynomials =

In mathematics, the little q-Laguerre polynomials p_{n}(x;a|q) or Wall polynomials W_{n}(x; b,q) are a family of basic hypergeometric orthogonal polynomials in the basic Askey scheme closely related to a continued fraction studied by Wall (1941). (The term "Wall polynomial" is also used for an unrelated Wall polynomial in the theory of classical groups.) Roelof Koekoek, Peter A. Lesky, and René F. Swarttouw (2010, 14) give a detailed list of their properties.

== Definition ==
The polynomials are given in terms of basic hypergeometric functions and the q-Pochhammer symbol by

$$\displaystyle  p_n(x;a|q) = {}_2\phi_1(q^{-n},0;aq;q,qx) = \frac{1}{(a^{-1}q^{-n};q)_n}{}_2\phi_0(q^{-n},x^{-1};;q,x/a)$$
