= Discrete q-Hermite polynomials =

In mathematics, the discrete q-Hermite polynomials are two closely related families h_{n}(x;q) and ĥ_{n}(x;q) of basic hypergeometric orthogonal polynomials in the basic Askey scheme, introduced by Al-Salam and Carlitz (1965). Roelof Koekoek, Peter A. Lesky, and René F. Swarttouw (2010, 14) give a detailed list of their properties. h_{n}(x;q) is also called discrete q-Hermite I polynomials and ĥ_{n}(x;q) is also called discrete q-Hermite II polynomials.

== Definition ==
The discrete q-Hermite polynomials are given in terms of basic hypergeometric functions and the Al-Salam–Carlitz polynomials by

$$\displaystyle h_n(x;q)=q^{\binom{n}{2}}{}_2\phi_1(q^{-n},x^{-1};0;q,-qx) = x^n{}_2\phi_0(q^{-n},q^{-n+1};;q^2,q^{2n-1}/x^2) = U_n^{(-1)}(x;q)$$
$$\displaystyle \hat h_n(x;q)=i^{-n}q^{-\binom{n}{2}}{}_2\phi_0(q^{-n},ix;;q,-q^n) = x^n{}_2\phi_1(q^{-n},q^{-n+1};0;q^2,-q^{2}/x^2) = i^{-n}V_n^{(-1)}(ix;q)$$

and are related by

$$h_n(ix;q^{-1}) = i^n\hat h_n(x;q)$$
