= Q-Laguerre polynomials =

In mathematics, the q-Laguerre polynomials, or generalized Stieltjes–Wigert polynomials P^{(α)}_{n}(x;q) are a family of basic hypergeometric orthogonal polynomials in the basic Askey scheme introduced by Moak 1981. Koekoek, Lesky & Swarttouw 2010 give a detailed list of their properties.

== Definition ==
The q-Laguerre polynomials are given in terms of basic hypergeometric functions and the q-Pochhammer symbol by

$$\displaystyle  L_n^{(\alpha)}(x;q) = \frac{(q^{\alpha+1};q)_n}{(q;q)_n} {}_1\phi_1(q^{-n};q^{\alpha+1};q,-q^{n+\alpha+1}x).$$

== Orthogonality ==
Orthogonality is defined by the unimono nature of the polynomials' convergence at boundaries in integral form.
