= Maixner =

Maixner is a surname. Notable people with the surname include:

- Franjo Maixner (1841–1903), Croatian academic
- Štefan Maixner (born 1968), Slovak footballer
- Wirginia Maixner (born 1963), Australian neurosurgeon

== See also ==
- Meixner
