= Dixon's identity =

On finite sums of products of three binomial coefficients, and a hypergeometric sum

In mathematics, Dixon's identity (or Dixon's theorem or Dixon's formula) is any of several different but closely related identities proved by A. C. Dixon, some involving finite sums of products of three binomial coefficients, and some evaluating a hypergeometric sum. These identities famously follow from the MacMahon Master theorem, and can now be routinely proven by computer algorithms (Ekhad 1990).

== Statements ==
The original identity, from (Dixon 1891), is

$$\sum_{k=-a}^{a}(-1)^{k}{2a\choose k+a}^3 =\frac{(3a)!}{(a!)^3}.$$

A generalization, also sometimes called Dixon's identity, is

$$\sum_{k\in\mathbb{Z}}(-1)^k{a+b\choose a+k} {b+c\choose b+k}{c+a\choose c+k}  = \frac{(a+b+c)!}{a!b!c!}$$

where a, b, and c are non-negative integers (Wilf 1994, p. 156). The sum on the left can be written as the terminating well-poised hypergeometric series

$${b+c\choose b-a}{c+a\choose c-a}{}_3F_2(-2a,-a-b,-a-c;1+b-a,1+c-a;1)$$

and the identity follows as a limiting case (as a tends to an integer) of Dixon's theorem evaluating a well-poised _{3}F_{2} generalized hypergeometric series at 1, from (Dixon 1902):

$$\;_3F_2 (a,b,c;1+a-b,1+a-c;1)=
\frac{\Gamma(1+a/2)\Gamma(1+a/2-b-c)\Gamma(1+a-b)\Gamma(1+a-c)}
{\Gamma(1+a)\Gamma(1+a-b-c)\Gamma(1+a/2-b)\Gamma(1+a/2-c)}.$$

This holds for Re(1 + 1/2a − b − c) > 0. As c tends to −∞ it reduces to Kummer's formula for the hypergeometric function _{2}F_{1} at −1. Dixon's theorem can be deduced from the evaluation of the Selberg integral.

== q-analogues ==
A q-analogue of Dixon's formula for the basic hypergeometric series in terms of the q-Pochhammer symbol is given by

$$\;_4 \varphi_3 \left[\begin{matrix}
a & -qa^{1/2} & b & c \\
&-a^{1/2} & aq/b & aq/c \end{matrix}
; q,qa^{1/2}/bc \right] =
\frac{(aq,aq/bc,qa^{1/2}/b,qa^{1/2}/c;q)_\infty}{(aq/b,aq/c,qa^{1/2},qa^{1/2}/bc;q)_\infty}$$

where |qa^{1/2}/bc| < 1.
