= Al-Salam–Carlitz polynomials =

In mathematics, Al-Salam–Carlitz polynomials U^{(a)}_{n}(x;q) and V^{(a)}_{n}(x;q) are two families of basic hypergeometric orthogonal polynomials in the basic Askey scheme, introduced by Waleed Al-Salam and Leonard Carlitz (1965). Roelof Koekoek, Peter A. Lesky, and René F. Swarttouw (2010, 14.24, 14.25) give a detailed list of their properties.

== Definition ==
The Al-Salam–Carlitz polynomials are given in terms of basic hypergeometric functions by

$$U_n^{(a)}(x;q) = (-a)^nq^{n(n-1)/2}{}_2\phi_1(q^{-n}, x^{-1};0;q,qx/a)$$
$$V_n^{(a)}(x;q) = (-a)^nq^{-n(n-1)/2}{}_2\phi_0(q^{-n}, x;-;q,q^n/a)$$
