= Carl Gustav Jacob Jacobi =

German mathematician (1804–1851)

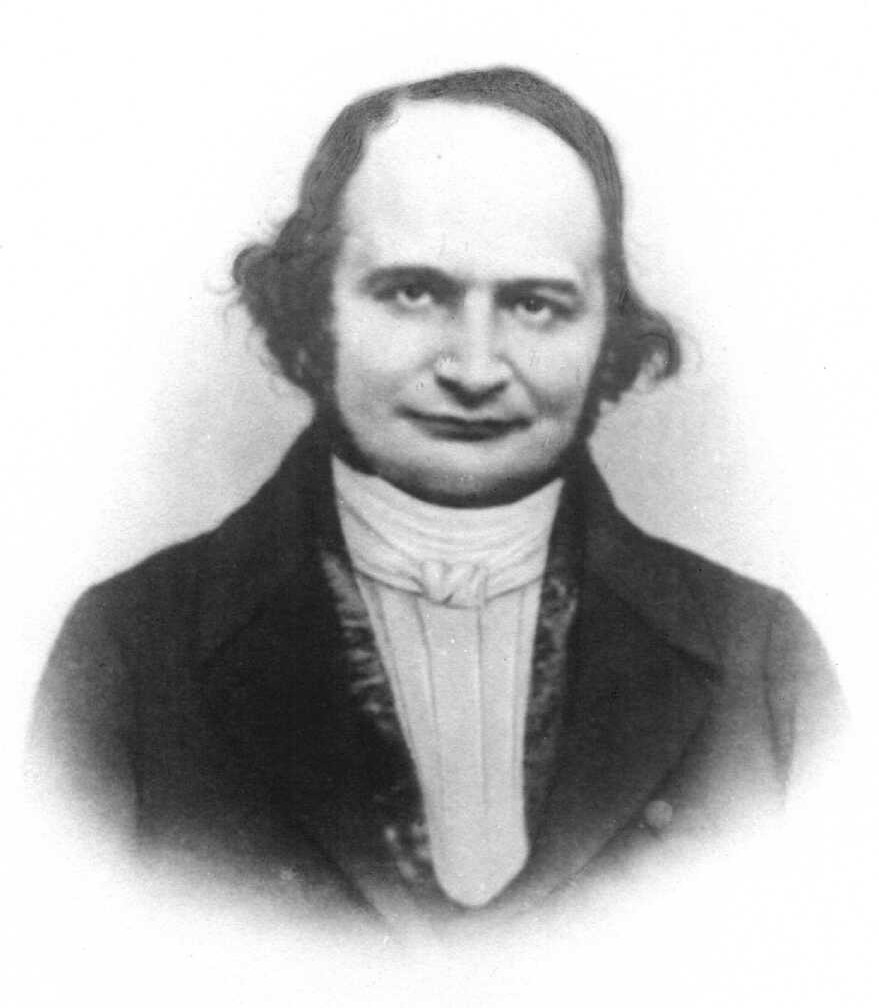
- Born: Jacques Simon Jacobi; 10 December 1804; Potsdam, Margraviate of Brandenburg, Kingdom of Prussia, Holy Roman Empire
- Died: 18 February 1851 (aged 46); Berlin, Kingdom of Prussia, German Confederation
- Education: University of Berlin (PhD, Dr. habil.)
- Known for: Popularizing the character ∂; Jacobi eigenvalue algorithm; Jacobi ellipsoid; Jacobi elliptic functions; Jacobi identity; Jacobi method; Jacobi operator; Jacobi polynomials; Jacobi symbol; Jacobi transform; Jacobian matrix; Hamilton–Jacobi equation; Abel–Jacobi theorem
- Relatives: Moritz von Jacobi (brother)
- Scientific career
- Fields: Mathematics
- Workplaces: University of Königsberg; University of Berlin
- Thesis: Disquisitiones Analyticae de Fractionibus Simplicibus (1825)
- Doctoral advisor: Enno Dirksen
- Doctoral students: Carl Wilhelm Borchardt; Otto Hesse; Friedrich Julius Richelot; Wilhelm Scheibner
- Other notable students: Gustav Kirchhoff

Carl Gustav Jacob Jacobi (Note: His given name is sometimes written as Karl Gustav Jakob.) (/jɑːˈkoʊbiˌ dʒəˈkoʊbi/; German: [jaˈkoːbi]; 10 December 1804 – 18 February 1851) was a German mathematician who made fundamental contributions to elliptic functions, dynamics, differential equations, determinants and number theory.

== Biography ==
Jacobi was born of Ashkenazi Jewish parentage in Potsdam on 10 December 1804. He was the second of four children of a banker, Simon Jacobi. His elder brother, Moritz, would also become known later as an engineer and physicist. He was initially home schooled by his uncle Lehman, who instructed him in the classical languages and elements of mathematics. In 1816, the twelve-year-old Jacobi went to the Potsdam Gymnasium, where students were taught all the standard subjects: classical languages, history, philology, mathematics, sciences, etc. As a result of the good education he had received from his uncle, as well as his own remarkable abilities, after less than half a year Jacobi was moved to the senior year despite his young age. However, as the University would not accept students younger than 16 years old, he had to remain in the senior class until 1821. He used this time to advance his knowledge, showing interest in all subjects, including Latin, Greek, philology, history and mathematics. During this period he also made his first attempts at research, trying to solve the quintic equation by radicals.

In 1821, Jacobi went to study at Berlin University, where he initially divided his attention between his passions for philology and mathematics. In philology, he participated in the seminars of August Böckh, drawing the professor's attention with his talent. Jacobi did not follow a lot of mathematics classes at the time, finding the level of mathematics taught at Berlin University too elementary. He continued, instead, with his private study of the more advanced works of Euler, Lagrange and Laplace. By 1823 he understood that he needed to make a decision between his competing interests and chose to devote all his attention to mathematics. In the same year he became qualified to teach secondary school and was offered a position at the Joachimsthal Gymnasium in Berlin. Jacobi decided instead to continue to work towards a university position. In 1825, he obtained the degree of Doctor of Philosophy with a dissertation on the partial fraction decomposition of rational fractions defended before a committee led by Enno Dirksen. He followed immediately with his habilitation and at the same time converted to Christianity. Now qualifying for teaching university classes, the 21-year-old Jacobi lectured in 1825/26 on the theory of curves and surfaces at the University of Berlin.

In 1826, Jacobi became a private lecturer, in the next year an extraordinary professor, and in finally 1829, a tenured professor of mathematics at Königsberg University, and held the chair until 1842. He suffered a breakdown from overwork in 1843. He then visited Italy for a few months to regain his health. On his return he moved to Berlin, where he lived as a royal pensioner, apart from a very brief interim, until his death. During the Revolution of 1848 Jacobi was politically involved and unsuccessfully presented his parliamentary candidature on behalf of a Liberal club. This led, after the suppression of the revolution, to his royal grant being cut off –but his fame and reputation were such that it was soon resumed, thanks to the personal intervention of Alexander von Humboldt.

Jacobi died in 1851 from a smallpox infection. His grave is preserved at a cemetery in the Kreuzberg section of Berlin, the Friedhof I der Dreifaltigkeits-Kirchengemeinde (61 Baruther Street). His grave is close to that of Johann Encke, the astronomer. The crater Jacobi on the Moon is named after him.

Jacobi's birth name was Jacques Simon Jacobi, a French-style name (his father was Simon Jacobi). Later, his name was Germanized to Carl Gustav Jacob Jacobi and published in its Latinized form as Carolus Gustavus Jacobus Jacobi. He is sometimes referred to as C. G. J. Jacobi.

== Scientific contributions ==
One of Jacobi's most impactful accomplishments was his theory of elliptic functions and their relation to the elliptic theta function. This was developed in his influential treatise Fundamenta nova theoriae functionum ellipticarum (1829), and in later papers in Crelle's Journal. Theta functions are of great importance in mathematical physics because of their role in the inverse problem for periodic and quasi-periodic flows. The equations of motion are integrable in terms of Jacobi's elliptic functions in the well-known cases of the pendulum, the Euler top, the symmetric Lagrange top in a gravitational field, and the Kepler problem (planetary motion in a central gravitational field).

He also made fundamental contributions in the study of differential equations and to classical mechanics, notably the Hamilton–Jacobi theory.

It was in algebraic development that Jacobi's particular power mainly lay, and he made important contributions of this kind in many areas of mathematics, as shown by his long list of papers in Crelle's Journal and elsewhere from 1826 onwards. He is said to have told his students that when looking for a research topic, one should 'Invert, always invert' (German original: "man muss immer umkehren"), reflecting his belief that inverting known results can open up new fields for research, for example inverting elliptic integrals and focusing on the nature of elliptic and theta functions.

In his 1835 paper, Jacobi proved the following basic result classifying periodic (including elliptic) functions:

If a univariate single-valued function is multiply periodic, then such a function cannot have more than two periods, and the ratio of the periods cannot be a real number.

He discovered many of the fundamental properties of theta functions, including the functional equation and the Jacobi triple product formula, as well as many other results on q-series and hypergeometric series.

The solution of the Jacobi inversion problem for the hyperelliptic Abel map by Weierstrass in 1854 required the introduction of the hyperelliptic theta function and later the general Riemann theta function for algebraic curves of arbitrary genus. The complex torus associated to a genus $g$ algebraic curve, obtained by quotienting ${\mathbf C}^g$ by the lattice of periods is referred to as the Jacobian variety. This method of inversion, and its subsequent extension by Weierstrass and Riemann to arbitrary algebraic curves, may be seen as a higher genus generalization of the relation between elliptic integrals and the Jacobi or Weierstrass elliptic functions.

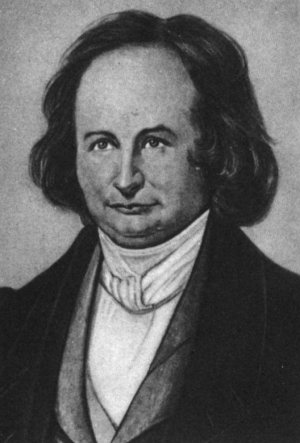
Carl Gustav Jacob Jacobi

Jacobi was the first to apply elliptic functions to number theory, for example proving Fermat's two-square theorem and Lagrange's four-square theorem, and similar results for 6 and 8 squares.

His other work in number theory continued the work of Gauss: new proofs of quadratic reciprocity, and the introduction of the Jacobi symbol; contributions to higher reciprocity laws, investigations of continued fractions, and the invention of Jacobi sums.

He was also one of the early founders of the theory of determinants. In particular, he invented the Jacobian determinant formed from the n^{2} partial derivatives of n given functions of n independent variables, which plays an important part in changes of variables in multiple integrals, and in many analytical investigations. In 1841 he reintroduced the partial derivative ∂ notation of Legendre, which was to become standard.

He was one of the first to introduce and study the symmetric polynomials that are now known as Schur polynomials, giving the so-called bialternant formula for these, which is a special case of the Weyl character formula, and deriving the Jacobi–Trudi identities. He also discovered the Desnanot–Jacobi formula for determinants, which underlie the Plücker relations for Grassmannians.

Students of vector fields, Lie theory, Hamiltonian mechanics and operator algebras often encounter the Jacobi identity, the analog of associativity for the Lie bracket operation.

Planetary theory and other particular dynamical problems likewise occupied his attention from time to time. While contributing to celestial mechanics, he introduced the Jacobi integral (1836) for a sidereal coordinate system. His theory of the last multiplier is treated in Vorlesungen über Dynamik, edited by Alfred Clebsch (1866).

He left many manuscripts, portions of which have been published at intervals in Crelle's Journal. His other works include Commentatio de transformatione integralis duplicis indefiniti in formam simpliciorem (1832), Canon arithmeticus (1839), and Opuscula mathematica (1846–1857). His Gesammelte Werke (1881–1891), or collected works, were published by the Berlin Academy.

== Publications ==
- Fundamenta nova theoriae functionum ellipticarum (in Latin). Cambridge University Press. 2012 [1829]. doi:10.1017/cbo9781139344081. ISBN 978-1-108-05200-9.
- Gesammelte Werke, Herausgegeben auf Veranlassung der Königlich Preussischen Akademie der Wissenschaften, vol. I–VIII (2nd ed.), New York: Chelsea Publishing Co., 1969 [1881], MR 0260557, archived from the original on 2013-05-13
- Canon arithmeticus, sive tabulae quibus exhibentur pro singulis numeris primis vel primorum potestatibus infra 1000 numeri ad datos indices et indices ad datos numeros pertinentes, Berlin: Typis Academicis, Berolini, 1839, MR 0081559
- "De formatione et proprietatibus Determinatium". Journal für die reine und angewandte Mathematik. 1841 (22): 285–318. 1841. doi:10.1515/crll.1841.22.285. ISSN 0075-4102. S2CID 123007787.
- Pulte, Helmut, ed. (1996) [1848], Vorlesungen über analytische Mechanik, Dokumente zur Geschichte der Mathematik [Documents on the History of Mathematics], vol. 8, Freiburg: Deutsche Mathematiker Vereinigung, doi:10.1007/978-3-322-80289-7, ISBN 978-3-528-06692-5, MR 1414679
- Vorlesungen über Zahlentheorie---Wintersemester 1836/37, Königsberg, Algorismus. Studien zur Geschichte der Mathematik und der Naturwissenschaften [Algorismus. Studies in the History of Mathematics and the Natural Sciences], vol. 62, Dr. Erwin Rauner Verlag, Augsburg, 2007 [1836], ISBN 978-3-936905-25-0, MR 2573816
- Clebsch, A.; Balagangadharan, K.; Banerjee, Biswarup, eds. (2009) [1866], Jacobi's lectures on dynamics, Texts and Readings in Mathematics, vol. 51, New Delhi: Hindustan Book Agency, ISBN 9788185931913, MR 2569315
- Ollivier, François; Cohn, Sigismund; Borchardt, C. W.; et al., eds. (2009) [1866], "The reduction to normal form of a non-normal system of differential equations" (PDF), Applicable Algebra in Engineering, Communication and Computing, Translation of De aequationum differentialium systemate non normali ad formam normalem revocando, 20 (1): 33–64, doi:10.1007/s00200-009-0088-2, ISSN 0938-1279, MR 2496660, S2CID 219629
- Ollivier, François; Cohn, Sigismund; Borchardt., C. W., eds. (2009) [1865], "Looking for the order of a system of arbitrary ordinary differential equations" (PDF), Applicable Algebra in Engineering, Communication and Computing, Translation of De investigando ordine systematis æquationibus differentialium vulgarium cujuscunque, 20 (1): 7–32, doi:10.1007/s00200-009-0087-3, ISSN 0938-1279, MR 2496659, S2CID 20652724

== See also ==
- Augustin-Louis Cauchy
- Friedrich Wilhelm Bessel
- Jacobi logarithm
- Last geometric statement of Jacobi
- List of things named after Carl Gustav Jacob Jacobi
- Niels Henrik Abel
