= Q-Meixner–Pollaczek polynomials =

In mathematics, the q-Meixner–Pollaczek polynomials are a family of basic hypergeometric orthogonal polynomials in the basic Askey scheme. Roelof Koekoek, Peter A. Lesky, and René F. Swarttouw (2010, 14) give a detailed list of their properties.

== Definition ==
The polynomials are given in terms of basic hypergeometric functions and the q-Pochhammer symbol by ：

$$P_{n}(x;a\mid q) = a^{-n} e^{in\phi} \frac{(a^2;q)_n}{(q;q)_n}{}_3\phi_2(q^{-n}, ae^{i(\theta+2\phi)}, ae^{-i\theta}; a^2, 0 \mid q; q),\quad x=\cos(\theta+\phi).$$
