= Continuous q-Hermite polynomials =

In mathematics, the continuous q-Hermite polynomials are a family of basic hypergeometric orthogonal polynomials in the basic Askey scheme. Roelof Koekoek, Peter A. Lesky, and René F. Swarttouw (2010, 14) give a detailed list of their properties.

== Definition ==
The polynomials are given in terms of basic hypergeometric functions by

$$H_n(x|q)=e^{in\theta}{}_2\phi_0\left[\begin{matrix}
q^{-n},0\\
-\end{matrix}
;q,q^n e^{-2i\theta}\right],\quad x=\cos\,\theta.$$

== Recurrence and difference relations ==
$$2x H_n(x\mid q) = H_{n+1} (x\mid q) + (1-q^n) H_{n-1} (x\mid q)$$

with the initial conditions

$$H_0 (x\mid q) =1, H_{-1} (x\mid q) = 0$$

From the above, one can easily calculate:

$$\begin{align}
H_0 (x\mid q) & = 1 \\
H_1 (x\mid q) & = 2x \\
H_2 (x\mid q) & = 4x^2 - (1-q) \\
H_3 (x\mid q) & = 8x^3 - 2x(2-q-q^2) \\
H_4 (x\mid q) & = 16x^4 - 4x^2(3-q-q^2-q^3) + (1-q-q^3+q^4)
\end{align}$$

== Generating function ==
$$\sum_{n=0}^\infty H_n(x \mid q) \frac{t^n}{(q;q)_n} = \frac{1}
{\left( t e^{i \theta},t e^{-i \theta};q \right)_\infty}$$

where $\textstyle x=\cos \theta$.
