= Q-Racah polynomials =

In mathematics, the q-Racah polynomials are a family of basic hypergeometric orthogonal polynomials in the basic Askey scheme, introduced by Askey & Wilson (1979). Roelof Koekoek, Peter A. Lesky, and René F. Swarttouw (2010, 14) give a detailed list of their properties.

== Definition ==
The polynomials are given in terms of basic hypergeometric functions and the Pochhammer symbol by

$$p_n(q^{-x}+q^{x+1}cd;a,b,c,d;q) = {}_4\phi_3\left[\begin{matrix} q^{-n} &abq^{n+1}&q^{-x}&q^{x+1}cd\\
aq&bdq&cq\\ \end{matrix};q;q\right]$$

They are sometimes given with changes of variables as

$$W_n(x;a,b,c,N;q) = {}_4\phi_3\left[\begin{matrix} q^{-n} &abq^{n+1}&q^{-x}&cq^{x-n}\\
aq&bcq&q^{-N}\\ \end{matrix};q;q\right]$$

== Relation to other polynomials ==
q-Racah polynomials→Racah polynomials
