= Continuous big q-Hermite polynomials =

Family of basic hypergeometric orthogonal polynomials

In mathematics, the continuous big q-Hermite polynomials are a family of basic hypergeometric orthogonal polynomials in the basic Askey scheme. Roelof Koekoek, Peter A. Lesky, and René F. Swarttouw (2010, 14) give a detailed list of their properties.

== Definition ==
The polynomials are given in terms of basic hypergeometric functions.
$$H_n(x;a|q)=a^{-n}{}_{3}\phi_2\left[\begin{matrix}
q^{-n},ae^{i\theta},ae^{-i\theta}\\
0,0\end{matrix}
;q,q\right],\quad x=\cos\,\theta.$$
