= Dual q-Krawtchouk polynomials =

In mathematics, the dual q-Krawtchouk polynomials are a family of basic hypergeometric orthogonal polynomials in the basic Askey scheme. Roelof Koekoek, Peter A. Lesky, and René F. Swarttouw (2010, 14) give a detailed list of their properties.

== Definition ==
The polynomials are given in terms of basic hypergeometric functions by

$$K_n(\lambda(x);c,N|q)={}_3\phi_2(q^{-n},q^{-x},cq^{x-N};q^{-N},0|q;q),\quad n=0,1,2,...,N,$$
where $\lambda(x)=q^{-x}+cq^{x-N}.$
