= Quantum q-Krawtchouk polynomials =

In mathematics, the quantum q-Krawtchouk polynomials are a family of basic hypergeometric orthogonal polynomials in the basic Askey scheme. Roelof Koekoek, Peter A. Lesky, and René F. Swarttouw (2010, 14) give a detailed list of their properties.

== Definition ==
The polynomials are given in terms of basic hypergeometric functions by

$$K_n^{qtm}(q^{-x};p,N;q)={}_2\phi_1\left[\begin{matrix}
q^{-n},q^{-x}\\
q^{-N}\end{matrix}
;q;pq^{n+1}\right]\qquad n=0,1,2,...,N.$$
