= Continuous q-Jacobi polynomials =

Family of orthogonal polynomials

In mathematics, the continuous q-Jacobi polynomials P^{(α,β)}_{n}(x|q), introduced by Askey & Wilson (1985), are a family of basic hypergeometric orthogonal polynomials in the basic Askey scheme. Roelof Koekoek, Peter A. Lesky, and René F. Swarttouw (2010, 14) give a detailed list of their properties.

== Definition ==
The polynomials are given in terms of basic hypergeometric functions and the q-Pochhammer symbol by

$$P_n^{(\alpha,\beta)}(x;q)=\frac{(q^{n+1};q)_n}{(q;q)_n}{}_4\phi_3\left[\begin{matrix}
q^{-n},q^{n+\alpha+\beta+1},q^{\frac12\alpha+\frac14e^{i\theta}},q^{\frac12\alpha+\frac14e^{-i\theta}}\\
q^{n+1},-q^{\frac12(\alpha+\beta+1)},-q^{\frac12(\alpha+\beta+2)}\end{matrix}
;q,q\right]\qquad x=\cos\,\theta.$$
