= Biorthogonal polynomial =

In mathematics, a biorthogonal polynomial is a polynomial that is orthogonal to several different measures. Biorthogonal polynomials are a generalization of orthogonal polynomials and share many of their properties. There are two different concepts of biorthogonal polynomials in the literature: Iserles & Nørsett (1988) introduced the concept of polynomials biorthogonal with respect to a sequence of measures, while Szegő introduced the concept of two sequences of polynomials that are biorthogonal with respect to each other.

== Polynomials biorthogonal with respect to a sequence of measures ==
A polynomial p is called biorthogonal with respect to a sequence of measures μ_{1}, μ_{2}, ... if

$\int p(x) \, d\mu_i(x) =0$ whenever i ≤ deg(p).

== Biorthogonal pairs of sequences ==
Two sequences ψ_{0}, ψ_{1}, ... and φ_{0}, φ_{1}, ... of polynomials are called biorthogonal (for some measure μ) if

$$\int \phi_m(x)\psi_n(x) \, d\mu(x) = 0$$

whenever m ≠ n.

The definition of biorthogonal pairs of sequences is in some sense a special case of the definition of biorthogonality with respect to a sequence of measures. More precisely two sequences ψ_{0}, ψ_{1}, ... and φ_{0}, φ_{1}, ... of polynomials are biorthogonal for the measure μ if and only if the sequence ψ_{0}, ψ_{1}, ... is biorthogonal for the sequence of measures φ_{0}μ, φ_{1}μ, ..., and the sequence φ_{0}, φ_{1}, ... is biorthogonal for the sequence of measures ψ_{0}μ, ψ_{1}μ,....
