= Q-Meixner polynomials =

In mathematics, the q-Meixner polynomials are a family of basic hypergeometric orthogonal polynomials in the basic Askey scheme. Roelof Koekoek, Peter A. Lesky, and René F. Swarttouw (2010, 14) give a detailed list of their properties.

== Definition ==
The polynomials are given in terms of basic hypergeometric functions by

$$M_n(q^{-x};b,c;q)={}_2\phi_1\left[\begin{matrix}
q^{-n},q^{-x}\\
bq\end{matrix}
;q,-\frac{q^{n+1}}{c}\right].$$
