= Quantized enveloping algebra =

In mathematics, a quantum or quantized enveloping algebra is a q-analog of a universal enveloping algebra. Given a Lie algebra $\mathfrak{g}$, the quantum enveloping algebra is typically denoted as $U_q(\mathfrak{g})$. The notation was introduced by Drinfeld and independently by Jimbo.

Among the applications, studying the $q \to 0$ limit led to the discovery of crystal bases.

== The case of $\mathfrak{sl}_2$ ==
Michio Jimbo considered the algebras with three generators related by the three commutators

$$[h,e] = 2e,\ [h,f] = -2f,\ [e,f] = \sinh(\eta h)/\sinh \eta.$$

When $\eta \to 0$, these reduce to the commutators that define the special linear Lie algebra $\mathfrak{sl}_2$. In contrast, for nonzero $\eta$, the algebra defined by these relations is not a Lie algebra but instead an associative algebra that can be regarded as a deformation of the universal enveloping algebra of $\mathfrak{sl}_2$.

== See also ==
- Quantum group
