= Jacobi zeta function =

In mathematics, the Jacobi zeta function Z(u) is the logarithmic derivative of the Jacobi theta function Θ(u). It is also commonly denoted as $\operatorname{zn}(u,k)$

$$\Theta(u)=\Theta_{4}\left(\frac{\pi u}{2K}\right)$$
$Z(u)=\frac{\partial}{\partial u}\ln\Theta(u)$ $=\frac{\Theta'(u)}{\Theta(u)}$
$Z(\phi|m)=E(\phi|m)-\frac{E(m)}{K(m)}F(\phi|m)$
Where E, K, and F are generic Incomplete Elliptical Integrals of the first and second kind. Jacobi Zeta Functions being kinds of Jacobi theta functions have applications to all their relevant fields and application.
$\operatorname{zn}(u,k)=Z(u)=\int_{0}^{u}\operatorname{dn}^{2}v-\frac{E}{K}dv$
This relates Jacobi's common notation of, $\operatorname{dn}{u}=\sqrt{1-m \sin{\theta}^2}$, $\operatorname{sn}u= \sin{\theta}$, $\operatorname{cn}u= \cos{\theta}$. to Jacobi's Zeta function.
Some additional relations include ,
$\operatorname{zn}(u,k)=\frac{\pi}{2K}\frac{\Theta_1'\frac{\pi u}{2K}}{\Theta_1\frac{\pi u}{2K}}-\frac{\operatorname{cn}{u}\,\operatorname{dn}{u}}{\operatorname{sn}{u}}$
$\operatorname{zn}(u,k)=\frac{\pi}{2K}\frac{\Theta_2'\frac{\pi u}{2K}}{\Theta_2\frac{\pi u}{2K}}-\frac{\operatorname{sn}{u}\,\operatorname{dn}{u}}{\operatorname{cn}{u}}$
$\operatorname{zn}(u,k)=\frac{\pi}{2K}\frac{\Theta_3'\frac{\pi u}{2K}}{\Theta_3\frac{\pi u}{2K}}-k^2\frac{\operatorname{sn}{u}\,\operatorname{cn}{u}}{\operatorname{dn}{u}}$
$\operatorname{zn}(u,k)=\frac{\pi}{2K}\frac{\Theta_4'\frac{\pi u}{2K}}{\Theta_4\frac{\pi u}{2K}}$
