= Big q-Jacobi polynomials =

In mathematics, the big q-Jacobi polynomials P_{n}(x;a,b,c;q) are a family of basic hypergeometric orthogonal polynomials in the basic Askey scheme.

== Definition ==
The polynomials are given in terms of basic hypergeometric functions by

$$\displaystyle   P_n(x;a,b,c;q)={}_3\phi_2(q^{-n},abq^{n+1},x;aq,cq;q,q)$$
