= Wilson polynomials =

In mathematics, Wilson polynomials are a family of orthogonal polynomials introduced by James Wilson that generalize Jacobi polynomials, Hahn polynomials, and Charlier polynomials.

They are defined in terms of the generalized hypergeometric function and the Pochhammer symbols by

$$p_n(t^2)=(a+b)_n(a+c)_n(a+d)_n {}_4F_3\left( \begin{matrix} -n&a+b+c+d+n-1&a-t&a+t \\ a+b&a+c&a+d \end{matrix} ;1\right).$$

== See also ==
- Askey–Wilson polynomials are a q-analogue of Wilson polynomials.
