= Little q-Jacobi polynomials =

Mathematical family

In mathematics, the little q-Jacobi polynomials p_{n}(x;a,b;q) are a family of basic hypergeometric orthogonal polynomials in the basic Askey scheme, introduced by Hahn (1949). Roelof Koekoek, Peter A. Lesky, and René F. Swarttouw (2010, 14) give a detailed list of their properties.

== Definition ==
The little q-Jacobi polynomials are given in terms of basic hypergeometric functions by

$$\displaystyle  p_n(x;a,b;q) = {}_2\phi_1(q^{-n},abq^{n+1};aq;q,xq)$$

== Gallery ==
The following are a set of animation plots for Little q-Jacobi polynomials, with varying q; three density plots of imaginary, real and modulus in complex space; three set of complex 3D plots of imaginary, real and modulus of the said polynomials.

LITTLE q-JACOBI POLYNOMIALS ABS COMPLEX 3D MAPLE PLOT

LITTLE q-JACOBI POLYNOMIALS IM COMPLEX 3D MAPLE PLOT

LITTLE q-JACOBI POLYNOMIALS RE COMPLEX 3D MAPLE PLOT

LITTLE q-JACOBI POLYNOMIALS ABS DENSITY MAPLE PLOT

LITTLE q-JACOBI POLYNOMIALS IM DENSITY MAPLE PLOT

LITTLE q-JACOBI POLYNOMIALS RE DENSITY MAPLE PLOT
