= Last geometric statement of Jacobi =

In differential geometry, the last geometric statement of Jacobi is a conjecture named after Carl Gustav Jacob Jacobi, which states:

Every caustic from any point $p$ on an ellipsoid other than umbilical points has exactly four cusps.

Numerical experiments had indicated the statement is true before it was proven rigorously in 2004 by Itoh and Kiyohara. It has since been extended to a wider class of surfaces beyond the ellipsoid.

== See also ==
- Four-vertex theorem
- Geodesics on an ellipsoid
