= Pseudo Jacobi polynomials =

In mathematics, the term Pseudo Jacobi polynomials was introduced by Lesky for one of three finite sequences of orthogonal polynomials y. Since they form an orthogonal subset of Routh polynomials it seems consistent to refer to them as Romanovski-Routh polynomials, by analogy with the terms Romanovski-Bessel and Romanovski-Jacobi used by Lesky. As shown by Askey for two other sequencesth is finite sequence orthogonal polynomials of can be expressed in terms of Jacobi polynomials of imaginary argument. In following Raposo et al. they are often referred to simply as Romanovski polynomials.
