= Sieved Jacobi polynomials =

In mathematics, sieved Jacobi polynomials are a family of sieved orthogonal polynomials, introduced by Askey (1984). Their recurrence relations are a modified (or "sieved") version of the recurrence relations for Jacobi polynomials.
