= Meixner polynomials =

In mathematics, Meixner polynomials, also called discrete Laguerre polynomials, are a family of discrete orthogonal polynomials introduced by Josef Meixner. They are given in terms of binomial coefficients and the (rising) Pochhammer symbol by

$$M_n(x,\beta,\gamma) = \sum_{k=0}^n (-1)^k{n \choose k}{x\choose k}k!(x+\beta)_{n-k}\gamma^{-k}$$.

Meixner polynomials belong to the Hahn class of polynomials, along with Hahn polynomials, Charlier polynomials, and Kravchuk polynomials.

== See also ==
- Kravchuk polynomials
