= Gaussian binomial coefficient =

Family of polynomials

In mathematics, the Gaussian binomial coefficients (also called Gaussian coefficients, Gaussian numbers, Gaussian polynomials, or q-binomial coefficients) are q-analogs of the binomial coefficients. The Gaussian binomial coefficient, written as
$$\begin{bmatrix}n\\ k\end{bmatrix}_q$$
or $\binom nk_{\!q}$, is a polynomial in q with integer coefficients, whose value when q is set to a prime power counts the number of subspaces of dimension k in a vector space of dimension n over $\mathbb{F}_q$, a finite field with q elements; i.e. it is the number of points in the finite Grassmannian $\mathrm{Gr}(k, \mathbb{F}_q^n)$.

== Definition ==
The Gaussian binomial coefficients are defined by:

$${m \choose r}_{\!q}
=
\frac{(1-q^m)(1-q^{m-1})\cdots(1-q^{m-r+1})} {(1-q)(1-q^2)\cdots(1-q^r)}$$

where m and r are non-negative integers. If r > m, this evaluates to 0. For r = 0, the value is 1 since both the numerator and denominator are empty products.

Although the formula at first appears to be a rational function, it actually is a polynomial, because the division is exact in Z[q].

All of the factors in numerator and denominator are divisible by 1 − q, and the quotient is the q-number:

$$[k]_q=\sum_{0\leq i<k}q^i=1+q+q^2+\cdots+q^{k-1}=
\begin{cases}
\frac{1-q^k}{1-q} & \text{for} & q \neq 1 \\[.2em]
\ \ \,k & \text{for} & q = 1
\end{cases},$$

Dividing out these factors gives the equivalent formula

$${m \choose r}_{\!q}=\frac{[m]_q[m-1]_q\cdots[m-r+1]_q}{[1]_q[2]_q\cdots[r]_q}\quad(r\leq m).$$

In terms of the q factorial $[n]_q!=[1]_q[2]_q\cdots[n]_q$, the formula can be stated as

$${m \choose r}_{\!q}=\frac{[m]_q!}{[r]_q!\,[m-r]_q!}\quad(r\leq m).$$

Substituting q = 1 into $\tbinom mr_q$ gives the ordinary binomial coefficient $\tbinom mr$.

The Gaussian binomial coefficient has finite values as $m\rightarrow \infty$:

$${\infty \choose r}_{\!q} = \lim_{m\rightarrow \infty} {m \choose r}_{\!q} = \frac{1} {(1-q)(1-q^2)\cdots(1-q^r)} = \frac{1}{[r]_q!\,(1-q)^r}$$

== Examples ==
$${0 \choose 0}_{\!q} = {1 \choose 0}_{\!q} = 1$$

$${1 \choose 1}_{\!q} = \frac{1-q}{1-q}=1$$

$${2 \choose 1}_{\!q} = \frac{1-q^2}{1-q}=1+q$$

$${3 \choose 1}_{\!q} = \frac{1-q^3}{1-q}=1+q+q^2$$

$${3 \choose 2}_{\!q} = \frac{(1-q^3)(1-q^2)}{(1-q)(1-q^2)}=1+q+q^2$$

$${4 \choose 2}_{\!q} = \frac{(1-q^4)(1-q^3)}{(1-q)(1-q^2)}=(1+q^2)(1+q+q^2)=1+q+2q^2+q^3+q^4$$

$${6 \choose 3}_{\!q} = \frac{(1-q^6)(1-q^5)(1-q^4)}{(1-q)(1-q^2)(1-q^3)}=(1+q^2)(1+q^3)(1+q+q^2+q^3+q^4)=1 + q + 2 q^2 + 3 q^3 + 3 q^4 + 3 q^5 + 3 q^6 + 2 q^7 + q^8 + q^9$$

== Combinatorial descriptions ==
=== Inversions ===
One combinatorial description of Gaussian binomial coefficients involves inversions.

The ordinary binomial coefficient $\tbinom mr$ counts the r-combinations chosen from an m-element set. If one takes those m elements to be the different character positions in a word of length m, then each r-combination corresponds to a word of length m using an alphabet of two letters, say {0,1}, with r copies of the letter 1 (indicating the positions in the chosen combination) and m − r letters 0 (for the remaining positions).

So, for example, the ${4 \choose 2} = 6$ words using 0s and 1s are $0011, 0101, 0110, 1001, 1010, 1100$.

To obtain the Gaussian binomial coefficient $\tbinom mr_{\!q}$, each word is associated with a factor q^{d}, where d is the number of inversions of the word, where, in this case, an inversion is a pair of positions where the left of the pair holds the letter 1 and the right position holds the letter 0.

With the example above, there is one word with 0 inversions, $0011$, one word with 1 inversion, $0101$, two words with 2 inversions, $0110$, $1001$, one word with 3 inversions, $1010$, and one word with 4 inversions, $1100$. This is also the number of left-shifts of the 1s from the initial position.

These correspond to the coefficients in ${4 \choose 2}_{\!q} = 1+q+2q^2+q^3+q^4$.

Another way to see this is to associate each word with a path across a rectangular grid with height r and width m − r, going from the bottom left corner to the top right corner. The path takes a step right for each 0 and a step up for each 1. An inversion switches the directions of a step (right+up becomes up+right and vice versa), hence the number of inversions equals the area under the path.

=== Balls into bins ===
Let $B(n,m,r)$ be the number of ways of throwing $r$ indistinguishable balls into $m$ indistinguishable bins, where each bin can contain up to $n$ balls. The Gaussian binomial coefficient can be used to characterize $B(n,m,r)$. Indeed,

$$B(n,m,r)= [q^r] {n+m \choose m}_{\!q}.$$

where $[q^r]P$ denotes the coefficient of $q^r$ in polynomial $P$ (see also Applications section below).

== Properties ==
=== Reflection ===
Like the ordinary binomial coefficients, the Gaussian binomial coefficients are center-symmetric, i.e., invariant under the reflection $r \mapsto m-r$:

$${m \choose r}_{\!q} = {m \choose m-r}_{\!q}.$$

In particular,

$${m \choose 0}_{\!q} ={m \choose m}_{\!q}=1 \, ,$$

$${m \choose 1}_{\!q} ={m \choose m-1}_{\!q}=\frac{1-q^m}{1-q}=1+q+ \cdots + q^{m-1} \quad m \ge 1 \, .$$

=== Limit at q = 1 ===
The evaluation of a Gaussian binomial coefficient at q = 1 is

$$\lim_{q \to 1} \binom{m}{r}_{\!q} = \binom{m}{r}$$

i.e. the sum of the coefficients gives the corresponding binomial value.

=== Degree of polynomial ===
The degree of $\binom{m}{r}_{\!q}$ is: $\binom{m+1}{2}-\binom{r+1}{2}-\binom{(m{-}r)+1}{2} = r(m-r)$.

== q-identities ==
=== Analogs of Pascal's identity ===
The analogs of Pascal's identity for the Gaussian binomial coefficients are:

$${m \choose r}_{\!q} = q^r {m-1 \choose r}_{\!q} + {m-1 \choose r-1}_{\!q}$$

and

$${m \choose r}_{\!q} = {m-1 \choose r}_{\!q} + q^{m-r}{m-1 \choose r-1}_{\!q}.$$

When $q=1$, these both give the usual binomial identity. We can see that as $m\to\infty$, both equations remain valid.

The first Pascal analog allows computation of the Gaussian binomial coefficients recursively (with respect to m ) using the initial values

$${m \choose m}_{\!q} ={m \choose 0}_{\!q}=1$$

and also shows that the Gaussian binomial coefficients are indeed polynomials (in q).

The second Pascal analog follows from the first using the substitution $r \rightarrow m-r$ and the invariance of the Gaussian binomial coefficients under the reflection $r \rightarrow m-r$.

These identities have natural interpretations in terms of linear algebra. Recall that $\tbinom{m}{r}_q$ counts r-dimensional subspaces $V\subset \mathbb{F}_q^m$, and let $\pi:\mathbb{F}_q^m \to \mathbb{F}_q^{m-1}$ be a projection with one-dimensional nullspace $E_1$. The first identity comes from the bijection which takes $V\subset \mathbb{F}_q^m$ to the subspace $V' = \pi(V)\subset \mathbb{F}_q^{m-1}$; in case $E_1\not\subset V$, the space $V'$ is r-dimensional, and we must also keep track of the linear function $\phi:V'\to E_1$ whose graph is $V$; but in case $E_1\subset V$, the space $V'$ is (r−1)-dimensional, and we can reconstruct $V=\pi^{-1}(V')$ without any extra information. The second identity has a similar interpretation, taking $V$ to $V' = V\cap E_{n-1}$ for an (m−1)-dimensional space $E_{m-1}$, again splitting into two cases.

=== Proofs of the analogs ===
Both analogs can be proved by first noting that from the definition of $\tbinom{m}{r}_q$, we have:

$\binom{m}{r}_q = \frac{1-q^m}{1-q^{m-r}} \binom{m-1}{r}_q$	1

$\binom{m}{r}_q = \frac{1-q^m}{1-q^r} \binom{m-1}{r-1}_q$	2

$\frac{1-q^r}{1-q^{m-r}}\binom{m-1}{r}_q = \binom{m-1}{r-1}_q$	3

As

$$\frac{1-q^m}{1-q^{m-r}}=\frac{1-q^r+q^r-q^m}{1-q^{m-r}}=q^r+\frac{1-q^r}{1-q^{m-r}}$$

Equation (1) becomes:

$$\binom{m}{r}_q = q^r\binom{m-1}{r}_q + \frac{1-q^r}{1-q^{m-r}}\binom{m-1}{r}_q$$

and substituting equation (3) gives the first analog.

A similar process, using

$$\frac{1-q^m}{1-q^r}=q^{m-r}+\frac{1-q^{m-r}}{1-q^r}$$

instead, gives the second analog.

=== q-binomial theorem ===
There is an analog of the binomial theorem for q-binomial coefficients, known as the Cauchy binomial theorem:

$$\prod_{k=0}^{n-1} (1+q^kt)=\sum_{k=0}^n q^{k(k-1)/2}
{n \choose k}_{\!q} t^k .$$

Like the usual binomial theorem, this formula has numerous generalizations and extensions; one such, corresponding to Newton's generalized binomial theorem for negative powers, is

$$\prod_{k=0}^{n-1} \frac{1}{1-q^kt}=\sum_{k=0}^\infty
{n+k-1 \choose k}_{\!q} t^k.$$

In the limit $n\rightarrow\infty$, these formulas yield

$$\prod_{k=0}^{\infty} (1+q^kt)=\sum_{k=0}^\infty \frac{q^{k(k-1)/2}t^k}{[k]_q!\,(1-q)^k}$$

and

$$\prod_{k=0}^\infty \frac{1}{1-q^kt}=\sum_{k=0}^\infty
\frac{t^k}{[k]_q!\,(1-q)^k}$$.

Setting $t=q$ gives the generating functions counting partitions with distinct and arbitrary parts, respectively.

=== Central q-binomial identity ===
With the ordinary binomial coefficients, we have:

$$\sum_{k=0}^n \binom{n}{k}^{\!2} = \binom{2n}{n}$$

With q-binomial coefficients, the analog is:

$$\sum_{k=0}^n q^{k^2}\binom{n}{k}_{\!q}^{\!2} = \binom{2n}{n}_{\!q}$$

== Applications ==
=== Gauss sums ===
Gauss originally used the Gaussian binomial coefficients in his determination of the sign of the quadratic Gauss sum.

=== Symmetric polynomials and partitions ===
Gaussian binomial coefficients occur in the counting of symmetric polynomials and in the theory of partitions. The coefficient of q^{r} in

$${n+m \choose m}_{\!q}$$

is the number of partitions of r with m or fewer parts each less than or equal to n. Equivalently, it is also the number of partitions of r with n or fewer parts each less than or equal to m.

=== Counting subspaces over a finite field ===
Gaussian binomial coefficients also play an important role in the enumerative theory of projective spaces defined over a finite field. In particular, for every finite field $\mathbb{F}_q$ with q elements, the Gaussian binomial coefficient

$${n \choose k}_{\!q}$$

counts the number of k-dimensional vector subspaces of an n-dimensional vector space over $\mathbb{F}_q$ (the points of a Grassmannian). When expanded as a polynomial in q, it yields the well-known decomposition of the Grassmannian into Schubert cells. For example, the Gaussian binomial coefficient

$${n \choose 1}_{\!q}=1+q+q^2+\cdots+q^{n-1}$$

is the number of one-dimensional subspaces in (F_{q})^{n}, or equivalently the number of points in the associated projective space. Furthermore, when q is 1 (respectively −1), the Gaussian binomial coefficient yields the Euler characteristic of the corresponding complex (respectively real) Grassmannian.

The number of k-dimensional affine subspaces of F_{q}^{n} is equal to

$$q^{n-k} {n \choose k}_{\!q}$$.

This allows another interpretation of the identity

$${m \choose r}_{\!q} = {m-1 \choose r}_{\!q} + q^{m-r}{m-1 \choose r-1}_{\!q}$$

as counting the (r − 1)-dimensional subspaces of (m − 1)-dimensional projective space by fixing a hyperplane, counting such subspaces contained in that hyperplane, and then counting the subspaces not contained in the hyperplane; these latter subspaces are in bijective correspondence with the (r − 1)-dimensional affine subspaces of the space obtained by treating this fixed hyperplane as the hyperplane at infinity.

=== Cyclic sieving phenomena ===
Gaussian binomial coefficients play an important role in the cyclic sieving phenomenon. Let C be a cyclic group of order n with generator c. Let X be the set of k-element subsets of the n-element set {1, 2, ..., n}. The group C has a canonical action on X given by sending c to the cyclic permutation (1, 2, ..., n). The number of fixed points of c^{d} on X is equal to

$$\binom nk_{\!q}$$

where q is taken to be the d-th power of a primitive n-th root of unity.

=== Quantum groups ===
In the conventions common in applications to quantum groups, a slightly different definition is used; the quantum binomial coefficient there is

$$q^{k^2 - n k}{n \choose k}_{\!q^2}$$.

This version of the quantum binomial coefficient is symmetric under exchange of $q$ and $q^{-1}$.

== See also ==
- List of q-analogs
