= Q-Pochhammer symbol =

Concept in combinatorics (part of mathematics)

In the mathematical field of combinatorics, the q-Pochhammer symbol, also called the q-shifted factorial, is the product
$$(a;q)_n = \prod_{k=0}^{n-1} (1-aq^k)=(1-a)(1-aq)(1-aq^2)\cdots(1-aq^{n-1}),$$
with $(a;q)_0 = 1.$ It is a q-analog of the Pochhammer symbol $x^{(n)} = x(x+1)\dots(x+n-1)$, in the sense that
$$\lim_{q\to1} \frac{(q^x;q)_n}{(1-q)^n} = x^{(n)}.$$
The q-Pochhammer symbol is a major building block in the construction of q-analogs; for instance, in the theory of basic hypergeometric series, it plays the role that the ordinary Pochhammer symbol plays in the theory of generalized hypergeometric series.

Unlike the ordinary Pochhammer symbol, the q-Pochhammer symbol can be extended to an infinite product:
$$(a;q)_\infty = \prod_{k=0}^{\infty} (1-aq^k).$$
This is an analytic function of q in the interior of the unit disk, and can also be considered as a formal power series in q. The special case
$$\phi(q) = (q;q)_\infty=\prod_{k=1}^\infty (1-q^k)$$
is known as Euler's function, and is important in combinatorics, number theory, and the theory of modular forms.

== Identities ==
The finite product can be expressed in terms of the infinite product:
$$(a;q)_n = \frac{(a;q)_\infty} {(aq^n;q)_\infty},$$
which extends the definition to negative integers n. Thus, for nonnegative n, one has
$$(a;q)_{-n} = \frac{1}{(aq^{-n};q)_n}=\prod_{k=1}^n \frac{1}{(1-a/q^k)}$$
and
$$(a;q)_{-n} = \frac{(-q/a)^n q^{n(n-1)/2}} {(q/a;q)_n}.$$
Alternatively,
$$\prod_{k=n}^\infty (1-aq^k)=(aq^n;q)_\infty = \frac{(a;q)_\infty} {(a;q)_n},$$
which is useful for some of the generating functions of partition functions.

The q-Pochhammer symbol is the subject of a number of q-series identities, particularly the infinite series expansions
$$(x;q)_\infty = \sum_{n=0}^\infty \frac{(-1)^n q^{n(n-1)/2}}{(q;q)_n} x^n$$
and
$$\frac{1}{(x;q)_\infty}=\sum_{n=0}^\infty \frac{x^n}{(q;q)_n},$$
which are both special cases of the q-binomial theorem:
$$\frac{(ax;q)_\infty}{(x;q)_\infty} = \sum_{n=0}^\infty \frac{(a;q)_n}{(q;q)_n} x^n.$$
Fridrikh Karpelevich found the following identity (see Olshanetsky and Rogov (1995) for the proof):
$$\frac{(q;q)_{\infty}}{(z;q)_{\infty}}=\sum_{n=0}^{\infty}\frac{(-1)^{n}q^{n(n+1)/2}}{(q;q)_n(1-zq^{n})}, \ |z|<1.$$

== Combinatorial interpretation ==
The q-Pochhammer symbol is closely related to the enumerative combinatorics of partitions. The coefficient of $q^m a^n$ in
$$(a;q)_\infty^{-1} = \prod_{k=0}^{\infty} (1-aq^k)^{-1}$$
is the number of partitions of m into at most n parts. Since, by conjugation of partitions, this is the same as the number of partitions of m into parts of size at most n, by identification of generating series we obtain the identity
$$(a;q)_\infty^{-1} = \sum_{k=0}^\infty \left(\prod_{j=1}^k \frac{1}{1-q^j} \right) a^k
= \sum_{k=0}^\infty \frac{a^k}{(q;q)_k}$$
as in the above section.

We also have that the coefficient of $q^m a^n$ in
$$(-a;q)_\infty = \prod_{k=0}^{\infty} (1+aq^k)$$
is the number of partitions of m into n or n-1 distinct parts.

By removing a triangular partition with n − 1 parts from such a partition, we are left with an arbitrary partition with at most n parts. This gives a weight-preserving bijection between the set of partitions into n or n − 1 distinct parts and the set of pairs consisting of a triangular partition having n − 1 parts and a partition with at most n parts. By identifying generating series, this leads to the identity
$$(-a;q)_\infty = \prod_{k=0}^\infty (1+aq^k)
= \sum_{k=0}^\infty \left(q^{k\choose 2} \prod_{j=1}^k \frac{1}{1-q^j}\right) a^k
= \sum_{k=0}^\infty \frac{q^{k\choose 2}}{(q;q)_k} a^k$$
also described in the above section. The reciprocal of the function $(q)_{\infty} := (q; q)_{\infty}$ similarly arises as the generating function for the partition function, $p(n)$, which is also expanded by the second two q-series expansions given below:
$$\frac{1}{(q; q)_{\infty}} = \sum_{n \geq 0} p(n) q^n = \sum_{n \geq 0} \frac{q^n}{(q; q)_n} = \sum_{n \geq 0} \frac{q^{n^2}}{(q; q)_n^2}.$$

The q-binomial theorem itself can also be handled by a slightly more involved combinatorial argument of a similar flavor (see also the expansions given in the next subsection).

Similarly,
$$(q; q)_{\infty} = 1 - \sum_{n \geq 0} q^{n+1}(q; q)_n = \sum_{n \geq 0} q^{\frac{n(n+1)}{2}}\frac{(-1)^n}{(q; q)_n}.$$

== Multiple arguments convention ==
Since identities involving q-Pochhammer symbols so frequently involve products of many symbols, the standard convention is to write a product as a single symbol of multiple arguments:
$$(a_1,a_2,\ldots,a_m;q)_n = (a_1;q)_n (a_2;q)_n \ldots (a_m;q)_n.$$

== q-series ==
A q-series is a series in which the coefficients are functions of q, typically expressions of $(a; q)_{n}$. Early results are due to Euler, Gauss, and Cauchy. The systematic study begins with Eduard Heine (1843).

== Relationship to other q-functions ==
The q-analog of n, also known as the q-bracket or q-number of n, is defined to be
$$[n]_q=\frac{1-q^n}{1-q}.$$
From this one can define the q-analog of the factorial, the q-factorial, as

$$\begin{align}
\left[n\right]!_q & = \prod_{k=1}^n [k]_q = [1]_q \cdot [2]_q \cdots [n-1]_q \cdot [n]_q \\
& = \frac{1-q}{1-q} \frac{1-q^2}{1-q} \cdots \frac{1-q^{n-1}}{1-q} \frac{1-q^n}{1-q} \\
& = 1 \cdot (1+q)\cdots (1+q+\cdots + q^{n-2}) \cdot (1+q+\cdots + q^{n-1}) \\
& = \frac{(q;q)_n}{(1-q)^n} \\
\end{align}$$

These numbers are analogues in the sense that
$$\lim_{q\rightarrow 1}[n]_q = n,$$
and so also
$$\lim_{q\rightarrow 1}[n]!_q = n!.$$

The limit value n! counts permutations of an n-element set S. Equivalently, it counts the number of sequences of nested sets $E_1 \subset E_2 \subset \cdots \subset E_n = S$ such that $E_i$ contains exactly i elements. By comparison, when q is a prime power and V is an n-dimensional vector space over the field with q elements, the q-analogue $[n]!_q$ is the number of complete flags in V, that is, it is the number of sequences $V_1 \subset V_2 \subset \cdots \subset V_n = V$ of subspaces such that $V_i$ has dimension i. The preceding considerations suggest that one can regard a sequence of nested sets as a flag over a conjectural field with one element.

A product of negative integer q-brackets can be expressed in terms of the q-factorial as
$$\prod_{k=1}^n [-k]_q = \frac{(-1)^n\,[n]!_q}{q^{n(n+1)/2}}$$

From the q-factorials, one can move on to define the q-binomial coefficients, also known as the Gaussian binomial coefficients, as
$$\begin{bmatrix}
n\\
k
\end{bmatrix}_q
=
\frac{[n]!_q}{[n-k]!_q [k]!_q},$$

where it is easy to see that the triangle of these coefficients is symmetric in the sense that

$$\begin{bmatrix} n \\ m \end{bmatrix}_q = \begin{bmatrix} n \\ n-m \end{bmatrix}_q$$

for all $0 \leq m \leq n$. One can check that

$$\begin{align}
\begin{bmatrix}
n+1\\
k
\end{bmatrix}_q
& =
\begin{bmatrix}
n\\
k
\end{bmatrix}_q
+
q^{n-k+1}
\begin{bmatrix}
n\\
k-1
\end{bmatrix}_q \\
& =
\begin{bmatrix} n \\ k-1 \end{bmatrix}_q + q^k \begin{bmatrix} n \\ k \end{bmatrix}_q.
\end{align}$$

One can also see from the previous recurrence relations that the next variants of the $q$-binomial theorem are expanded in terms of these coefficients as follows:
$$\begin{align}
(z; q)_n & = \sum_{j=0}^n \begin{bmatrix} n \\ j \end{bmatrix}_q (-z)^j q^{\binom{j}{2}} = (1-z)(1-qz) \cdots (1-z q^{n-1}) \\
(-q; q)_n & = \sum_{j=0}^n \begin{bmatrix} n \\ j \end{bmatrix}_{q^2} q^j \\
(q; q^2)_n & = \sum_{j=0}^{2n} \begin{bmatrix} 2n \\ j \end{bmatrix}_q (-1)^j \\
\frac{1}{(z; q)_{m+1}} & = \sum_{n \geq 0} \begin{bmatrix} n+m \\ n \end{bmatrix}_q z^n.
\end{align}$$

One may further define the q-multinomial coefficients
$$\begin{bmatrix}
n\\
k_1, \ldots ,k_m
\end{bmatrix}_q
=
\frac{[n]!_q}{[k_1]!_q \cdots [k_m]!_q},$$
where the arguments $k_1, \ldots, k_m$ are nonnegative integers that satisfy $\sum_{i=1}^m k_i = n$. The coefficient above counts the number of flags $V_1 \subset \dots \subset V_m$ of subspaces in an n-dimensional vector space over the field with q elements such that $\dim V_i = \sum_{j=1}^i k_j$.

The limit $q\to 1$ gives the usual multinomial coefficient ${n\choose k_1,\dots ,k_m}$, which counts words in n different symbols $\{s_1,\dots,s_m\}$ such that each $s_i$ appears $k_i$ times.

One also obtains a q-analog of the gamma function, called the q-gamma function, and defined as
$$\Gamma_q(x)=\frac{(1-q)^{1-x} (q;q)_\infty}{(q^x;q)_\infty}$$
This converges to the usual gamma function as q approaches 1 from inside the unit disc. Note that
$$\Gamma_q(x+1)=[x]_q\Gamma_q(x)$$
for any x and
$$\Gamma_q(n+1)=[n]!_q$$
for non-negative integer values of n. Alternatively, this may be taken as an extension of the q-factorial function to the real number system.

== See also ==
- List of q-analogs
- Basic hypergeometric series
- Elliptic gamma function
- Jacobi theta function
- Lambert series
- Pentagonal number theorem
- q-derivative
- q-theta function
- q-Vandermonde identity
- Rogers–Ramanujan identities
- Rogers–Ramanujan continued fraction
