= Basic hypergeometric series =

Q-analog of hypergeometric series

In mathematics, basic hypergeometric series, or q-hypergeometric series, are q-analogue generalizations of generalized hypergeometric series, and are in turn generalized by elliptic hypergeometric series. A series x_{n} is called hypergeometric if the ratio of successive terms x_{n+1}/x_{n} is a rational function of n. If the ratio of successive terms is a rational function of q^{n}, then the series is called a basic hypergeometric series. The number q is called the base.

The basic hypergeometric series ${}_2\phi_1(q^{\alpha},q^{\beta};q^{\gamma};q,x)$ was first considered by Eduard Heine (1846). It becomes the hypergeometric series $F(\alpha,\beta;\gamma;x)$ in the limit when base $q =1$.

== Definition ==
There are two forms of basic hypergeometric series, the unilateral basic hypergeometric series φ, and the more general bilateral basic hypergeometric series ψ. The unilateral basic hypergeometric series is defined as

$$\;_{j}\phi_k \left[\begin{matrix}
a_1 & a_2 & \ldots & a_{j} \\
b_1 & b_2 & \ldots & b_k \end{matrix}
; q,z \right] = \sum_{n=0}^\infty
\frac {(a_1, a_2, \ldots, a_{j};q)_n} {(b_1, b_2, \ldots, b_k,q;q)_n} \left((-1)^nq^{n\choose 2}\right)^{1+k-j}z^n$$

where

$$(a_1,a_2,\ldots,a_m;q)_n = (a_1;q)_n (a_2;q)_n \ldots (a_m;q)_n$$

and

$$(a;q)_n = \prod_{k=0}^{n-1} (1-aq^k)=(1-a)(1-aq)(1-aq^2)\cdots(1-aq^{n-1})$$

is the q-shifted factorial. The most important special case is when j = k + 1, when it becomes

$$\;_{k+1}\phi_k \left[\begin{matrix}
a_1 & a_2 & \ldots & a_{k}&a_{k+1} \\
b_1 & b_2 & \ldots & b_{k} \end{matrix}
; q,z \right] = \sum_{n=0}^\infty
\frac {(a_1, a_2, \ldots, a_{k+1};q)_n} {(b_1, b_2, \ldots, b_k,q;q)_n} z^n.$$

This series is called balanced if a_{1} ... a_{k + 1} = b_{1} ...b_{k}q. This series is called well poised if a_{1}q = a_{2}b_{1} = ... = a_{k + 1}b_{k}, and very well poised if in addition a_{2} = −a_{3} = qa_{1}^{1/2}. The unilateral basic hypergeometric series is a q-analog of the hypergeometric series since

$$\lim_{q\to 1}\;_{j}\phi_k \left[\begin{matrix}
q^{a_1} & q^{a_2} & \ldots & q^{a_j} \\
q^{b_1} & q^{b_2} & \ldots & q^{b_k} \end{matrix}
; q,(q-1)^{1+k-j} z \right]=\;_{j}F_k \left[\begin{matrix}
a_1 & a_2 & \ldots & a_j \\
b_1 & b_2 & \ldots & b_k \end{matrix}
;z \right]$$

holds (Koekoek & Swarttouw (1996)).
The bilateral basic hypergeometric series, corresponding to the bilateral hypergeometric series, is defined as

$$\;_j\psi_k \left[\begin{matrix}
a_1 & a_2 & \ldots & a_j \\
b_1 & b_2 & \ldots & b_k  \end{matrix}
; q,z \right] = \sum_{n=-\infty}^\infty
\frac {(a_1, a_2, \ldots, a_j;q)_n} {(b_1, b_2, \ldots, b_k;q)_n}  \left((-1)^nq^{n\choose 2}\right)^{k-j}z^n.$$

The most important special case is when j = k, when it becomes

$$\;_k\psi_k \left[\begin{matrix}
a_1 & a_2 & \ldots & a_k \\
b_1 & b_2 & \ldots & b_k  \end{matrix}
; q,z \right] = \sum_{n=-\infty}^\infty
\frac {(a_1, a_2, \ldots, a_k;q)_n} {(b_1, b_2, \ldots, b_k;q)_n} z^n.$$

The unilateral series can be obtained as a special case of the bilateral one by setting one of the b variables equal to q, at least when none of the a variables is a power of q, as all the terms with n < 0 then vanish.

== Simple series ==
Some simple series expressions include

$$\frac{z}{1-q} \;_{2}\phi_1 \left[\begin{matrix}
q \; q \\
q^2  \end{matrix}\;  ; q,z \right] =
\frac{z}{1-q}
+ \frac{z^2}{1-q^2}
+ \frac{z^3}{1-q^3}
+ \ldots$$

and

$$\frac{z}{1-q^{1/2}} \;_{2}\phi_1 \left[\begin{matrix}
q \; q^{1/2} \\
q^{3/2}  \end{matrix}\;  ; q,z \right] =
\frac{z}{1-q^{1/2}}
+ \frac{z^2}{1-q^{3/2}}
+ \frac{z^3}{1-q^{5/2}}
+ \ldots$$

and

$$\;_{2}\phi_1 \left[\begin{matrix}
q \; -1 \\
-q  \end{matrix}\;  ; q,z \right] = 1+
\frac{2z}{1+q}
+ \frac{2z^2}{1+q^2}
+ \frac{2z^3}{1+q^3}
+ \ldots.$$

== The q-binomial theorem ==
The q-binomial theorem (first published in 1811 by Heinrich August Rothe) states that
$$\;_{1}\phi_0 (a;q,z) =\frac{(az;q)_\infty}{(z;q)_\infty}= \prod_{n=0}^\infty
\frac {1-aq^n z}{1-q^n z}.$$
It can be proved by repeatedly applying the identity
$$\;_{1}\phi_0 (a;q,z) =
\frac {1-az}{1-z} \;_{1}\phi_0 (a;q,qz).$$
When $a= q^{-N}$ is a negative integer power of q, the hypergeometric sum is finite and one recovers the finite form
$$\sum_{n=0}^{N}y^nq^{n(n+1)/2}\begin{bmatrix}N\\n\end{bmatrix}_q=\prod_{k=1}^{N}\left(1+yq^k\right)$$
of the q-binomial theorem (also sometimes known as the Cauchy binomial theorem). Here
$$\begin{bmatrix}N\\n\end{bmatrix}_q$$
is a q-binomial coefficient.

The special case of a = 0 is closely related to the q-exponential.

== Ramanujan's identity ==
Srinivasa Ramanujan gave the identity
$$\;_1\psi_1 \left[\begin{matrix} a \\ b \end{matrix} ; q,z \right]
= \sum_{n=-\infty}^\infty \frac {(a;q)_n} {(b;q)_n} z^n
= \frac {(b/a,q,q/az,az;q)_\infty }
{(b,b/az,q/a,z;q)_\infty}$$
valid for |q| < 1 and |b/a| < |z| < 1. Similar identities for $\;_6\psi_6$ have been given by Bailey. Such identities can be understood to be generalizations of the Jacobi triple product theorem, which can be written using q-series as

$$\sum_{n=-\infty}^\infty q^{n(n+1)/2}z^n =
(q;q)_\infty \; (-1/z;q)_\infty \; (-zq;q)_\infty.$$

Gwynneth Coogan and Ken Ono give a related formal power series

$$A(z;q) \stackrel{\rm{def}}{=} \frac{1}{1+z} \sum_{n=0}^\infty
\frac{(z;q)_n}{(-zq;q)_n}z^n =
\sum_{n=0}^\infty (-1)^n z^{2n} q^{n^2}.$$

== Watson's contour integral ==
As an analogue of the Barnes integral for the hypergeometric series, Watson showed that

$${}_2\phi_1(a,b;c;q,z) = \frac{-1}{2\pi i}\frac{(a,b;q)_\infty}{(q,c;q)_\infty}
\int_{-i\infty}^{i\infty}\frac{(qq^s,cq^s;q)_\infty}{(aq^s,bq^s;q)_\infty}\frac{\pi(-z)^s}{\sin \pi s}ds$$

where the poles of $(aq^s,bq^s;q)_\infty$ lie to the left of the contour and the remaining poles lie to the right. There is a similar contour integral for _{r+1}φ_{r}. This contour integral gives an analytic continuation of the basic hypergeometric function in z.

== Matrix version ==
The basic hypergeometric matrix function can be defined as follows:

$${}_2\phi_1(A,B;C;q,z):= \sum_{n=0}^\infty\frac{(A;q)_n(B;q)_n}{(C;q)_n(q;q)_n}z^n,\quad (A;q)_0:=1,\quad(A;q)_n:=\prod_{k=0}^{n-1}(1-Aq^k).$$

The ratio test shows that this matrix function is absolutely convergent.

== See also ==
- Dixon's identity
- Rogers–Ramanujan identities
