= Hermitian wavelet =

Family of continuous wavelets

The Gaussian function (n=0) and its first derivatives.

Hermitian wavelets are a family of discrete and continuous wavelets used in the constant and discrete Hermite wavelet transforms. The $n^\textrm{th}$ Hermitian wavelet is defined as the normalized $n^\textrm{th}$ derivative of a Gaussian distribution for each positive $n$:
$$\Psi_{n}(x)=(2n)^{-\frac{n}{2}}c_{n}\operatorname{He}_{n}\left(x\right)e^{-\frac{1}{2}x^{2}},$$
where $\operatorname{He}_{n}(x)$ denotes the $n^\textrm{th}$ probabilist's Hermite polynomial. Each normalization coefficient $c_{n}$ is given by
$$c_{n} = \left(n^{\frac{1}{2}-n}\Gamma\left(n+\frac{1}{2}\right)\right)^{-\frac{1}{2}} = \left(n^{\frac{1}{2}-n}\sqrt{\pi}2^{-n}(2n-1)!!\right)^{-\frac{1}{2}}\quad n\in\mathbb{N}.$$
The function $\Psi\in L_{\rho, \mu}(-\infty, \infty)$ is said to be an admissible Hermite wavelet if it satisfies the admissibility condition:

$$C_\Psi = \sum_{n=0}^{\infty}{\frac{\|\hat\Psi (n)\|^2}{\|n\|}} < \infty$$

where $\hat \Psi (n)$ are the terms of the Hermite transform of $\Psi$.

The $n^{th}$ Hermitian wavelet has $n$ vanishing moments,

$$\int_{-\infty}^{\infty} x^k \Psi_n(x)\,dx = 0,
\qquad k=0,\ldots,n-1,$$

and is therefore insensitive to polynomial trends of degree less than $n$.

In computer vision and image processing, Gaussian derivative operators of different orders are frequently used as a basis for expressing various types of visual operations; see scale space and N-jet.

== Examples ==
The first three derivatives of the Gaussian function with $\mu=0,\;\sigma=1$:
$$f(t) = \pi^{-1/4}e^{(-t^2/2)},$$
are:
$$\begin{align}
f'(t)  & = -\pi^{-1/4}te^{(-t^2/2)}, \\
f''(t)          & = \pi^{-1/4}(t^2 - 1)e^{(-t^2/2)},\\
f^{(3)}(t) & = \pi^{-1/4}(3t - t^3)e^{(-t^2/2)},
\end{align}$$
and their $L^2$ norms $\lVert f' \rVert=\sqrt{2}/2, \lVert f'' \rVert=\sqrt{3}/2, \lVert f^{(3)} \rVert= \sqrt{30}/4$.

Normalizing the derivatives yields three Hermitian wavelets:
$$\begin{align}
\Psi_{1}(t) &= \sqrt{2}\pi^{-1/4}te^{(-t^2/2)},\\
\Psi_{2}(t) &=\frac{2}{3}\sqrt{3}\pi^{-1/4}(1-t^2)e^{(-t^2/2)},\\
\Psi_{3}(t) &= \frac{2}{15}\sqrt{30}\pi^{-1/4}(t^3 - 3t)e^{(-t^2/2)}.
\end{align}$$

== See also ==
- Wavelet
- The Ricker wavelet is the $n = 2$ Hermitian wavelet
