= Christoffel–Darboux formula =

Identity for a sequence of orthogonal polynomials

In mathematics, the Christoffel–Darboux formula or Christoffel–Darboux theorem is an identity for a sequence of orthogonal polynomials, introduced by Elwin Bruno Christoffel (1858) and Jean Gaston Darboux (1878).

Christoffel–Darboux formula—if a sequence of polynomials $f_0, f_1, \dots$ are of degrees $0, 1, \dots$, and orthogonal with respect to a probability measure $\mu$, then

$$\sum_{j=0}^n \frac{f_j(x) f_j(y)}{h_j} = \frac{k_n}{h_n k_{n+1}} \frac{f_n(y) f_{n+1}(x) - f_{n+1}(y) f_n(x)}{x - y}$$

where $h_j = \|f_j\|^2_\mu$ are the squared norms, and $k_j$ are the leading coefficients.

There is also a "confluent form" of this identity by taking $y\to x$ limit:

Christoffel–Darboux formula, confluent form—
$$\sum_{j=0}^n \frac{f_j^2(x)}{h_j} = \frac{k_n}{h_n k_{n+1}} \left[f_{n + 1}'(x)f_{n}(x) - f_{n}'(x) f_{n + 1}(x)\right].$$

== Proof ==
Lemma—Let $p_n$ be a sequence of polynomials orthonormal with respect to a probability measure $\mu$, such that $p_n$ has degree $n$, and define
$$a_{n}=\langle x p_{n},p_{n+1}\rangle,\qquad b_{n}=\langle x p_{n},p_{n}\rangle,\qquad n\geq0$$
(they are called the "Jacobi parameters"), then we have the three-term recurrence
$$\begin{array}{l l}{{p_{0}(x)=1,\qquad p_{1}(x)=\frac{x-b_{0}}{a_{0}},}}\\ {{x p_{n}(x)=a_{n}p_{n+1}(x)+b_{n}p_{n}(x)+a_{n-1}p_{n-1}(x),\qquad n\geq1}}\end{array}$$

Proof

By definition, $\langle xp_n, p_k \rangle = \langle p_n, xp_k \rangle$, so if $k \leq n-2$, then $xp_k$ is a linear combination of $p_0, ..., p_{n-1}$, and thus $\langle xp_n, p_k \rangle = 0$. So, to construct $p_{n+1}$, it suffices to perform Gram-Schmidt process on $xp_n$ using $p_{n}, p_{n-1}$, which yields the desired recurrence.

Proof of Christoffel–Darboux formula

For any sequence of nonzero constants $c_0, c_1, \dots$, we can change each $f_k$ to $c_kf_k$, and both sides of the equation would remain unchanged. Thus WLOG, scale each $f_n$ to $p_n$.

Since $\frac{k_{n+1}}{k_n}xp_n - p_{n+1}$ is a degree $n$ polynomial, it is perpendicular to $p_{n+1}$, and so $\langle \frac{k_{n+1}}{k_n}xp_n, p_{n+1}\rangle = \langle p_{n+1}, p_{n+1}\rangle = 1$. Thus, $a_n=\frac{k_n}{k_{n+1}}$.

Base case:

$$\frac{k_0}{k_1} \frac{p_0(y) p_1(x)-p_1(y) p_0(x)}{x-y}=\frac{k_0}{k_1} \frac{p_0(y) \frac{x-b_0}{a_0}-p_0(x) \frac{y-b_0}{a_0}}{x-y} = 1$$

Induction:

$$\begin{aligned}
&(x-y) \sum_{j=0}^n p_j(x) p_j(y)=(x-y) \sum_{j=0}^{n-1} p_j(x) p_j(y)+p_n(x) p_n(y)(x-y) \\
& \stackrel{\text { (IH) }}{=} \frac{k_{n-1}}{k_n}\left[p_n(x) p_{n-1}(y)-p_n(y) p_{n-1}(x)\right] + (x-y)p_n(x) p_n(y)
\end{aligned}$$

By the three-term recurrence,

$$\begin{aligned}
& x p_n(x)=a_n p_{n+1}(x)+b_n p_n(x)+a_{n-1} p_{n-1}(x) \\
& y p_n(y)=a_n p_{n+1}(y)+b_n p_n(y)+a_{n-1} p_{n-1}(y)
\end{aligned}$$

Multiply the first by $p_n(y)$ and the second by $p_n(x)$ and subtract:

$$(x-y) p_n(x) p_n(y)=a_n\left[p_n(y) p_{n+1}(x)-p_n(x) p_{n+1}(y)\right]+a_{n-1}\left[p_n(y) p_{n-1}(x)-p_n(x) p_{n-1}(y)\right]$$

Now substitute in $a_n=\frac{k_n}{k_{n+1}}, \quad a_{n-1}=\frac{k_{n-1}}{k_n}$ and simplify.

== Specific cases ==
=== Hermite ===
The Hermite polynomials are orthogonal with respect to the gaussian distribution.

The $H$ polynomials are orthogonal with respect to $\frac{1}{\sqrt{\pi}} e^{- x^2}$, and with $k_n = 2^n$.
$$\sum_{k=0}^n \frac{H_k(x) H_k(y)}{k!2^k} = \frac{1}{n!2^{n+1}}\,\frac{H_n(y) H_{n+1}(x) - H_n(x) H_{n+1}(y)}{x - y}.$$
The $\operatorname{He}$ polynomials are orthogonal with respect to $\frac{1}{\sqrt{2\pi}} e^{-\frac 12 x^2}$, and with $k_n = 1$.
$$\sum_{k=0}^n \frac{\operatorname{He}_k(x) \operatorname{He}_k(y)}{k!} = \frac{1}{n!}\,\frac{\operatorname{He}_n(y) \operatorname{He}_{n+1}(x) - \operatorname{He}_n(x) \operatorname{He}_{n+1}(y)}{x - y}.$$
The confluent form and the three-term recurrence gives
$$\sum_{k=0}^{n}\frac{H_k(x)^2}{k!2^k}=\frac{H_{n+1}(x)^2-H_{n+2}(x)H_n(x)}{n!2^{n+1}}$$
$$\sum_{k=0}^{n}\frac{\operatorname{He}_k(x)^2}{k!}=\frac{\operatorname{He}_{n+1}(x)^2-\operatorname{He}_{n+2}(x)\operatorname{He}_n(x)}{n!}$$

=== Laguerre ===
The Laguerre polynomials $L_n$ are orthonormal with respect to the exponential distribution $e^{-x}, \quad x \in (0, \infty)$, with $k_n = (-1)^n/n!$, so
$$\sum_{k=0}^n L_k(x) L_k(y)=\frac{n+1}{x-y}\left[L_n(x) L_{n+1}(y)-L_n(y) L_{n+1}(x)\right]$$

=== Legendre ===
Associated Legendre polynomials:

$$\begin{align} (\mu-\mu')\sum_{l=m}^L\,(2l+1)\frac{(l-m)!}{(l+m)!}\,P_{lm}(\mu)P_{lm}(\mu')=\qquad\qquad\qquad\qquad\qquad\\\frac{(L-m+1)!}{(L+m)!}\big[P_{L+1\,m}(\mu)P_{Lm}(\mu')-P_{Lm}(\mu)P_{L+1\,m}(\mu')\big].\end{align}$$

== Christoffel–Darboux kernel ==
The summation involved in the Christoffel–Darboux formula is invariant by scaling the polynomials with nonzero constants. Thus, each probability distribution $\mu$ defines a series of functions
$$K_n(x,y) := \sum_{j=0}^n f_j(x) f_j(y)/h_j, \quad n = 0, 1, \dots$$
which are called the Christoffel–Darboux kernels. By the orthogonality, the kernel satisfies
$$\int f(y) K_n(x, y) \mathrm{d} \mu(y)= \begin{cases}f(x), & f \in \operatorname{Span}\left(p_0, p_1, \ldots, p_n\right) \\ 0, & \int_a^b f(x) p_{\ell}(x) \mathrm{d} \mu(x)=0(\ell=0,1, \ldots, n)\end{cases}$$
In other words, the kernel is an integral operator that orthogonally projects each polynomial to the space of polynomials of degree up to $n$.

== See also ==
- Turán's inequalities
- Sturm's theorem
