= Wick product =

Mathematical operation on random variables

In probability theory, the Wick product, named for Italian physicist Gian-Carlo Wick, is a particular way of defining an adjusted product of a set of random variables. In the lowest order product the adjustment corresponds to subtracting off the mean value, to leave a result whose mean is zero. For the higher-order products the adjustment involves subtracting off lower order (ordinary) products of the random variables, in a symmetric way, again leaving a result whose mean is zero. The Wick product is a polynomial function of the random variables, their expected values, and expected values of their products.

The definition of the Wick product immediately leads to the Wick power of a single random variable, and this allows analogues of other functions of random variables to be defined on the basis of replacing the ordinary powers in a power series expansion by the Wick powers. The Wick powers of commonly-seen random variables can be expressed in terms of special functions such as Bernoulli polynomials or Hermite polynomials.

== Definition ==
Assume that X_{1}, ..., X_{k} are random variables with finite moments. The Wick product

$$\langle X_1,\dots,X_k \rangle\,$$

is a sort of product defined recursively as follows:

$$\langle \rangle = 1\,$$

(i.e. the empty product—the product of no random variables at all—is 1). For k ≥ 1, we impose the requirement

$${\partial\langle X_1,\dots,X_k\rangle \over \partial X_i}
= \langle X_1,\dots,X_{i-1}, \widehat{X}_i, X_{i+1},\dots,X_k \rangle,$$

where $\widehat{X}_i$ means that X_{i} is absent, together with the constraint that the average is zero,

$$\operatorname{E} \bigl[\langle X_1,\dots,X_k\rangle \bigr] = 0. \,$$

Equivalently, the Wick product can be defined by writing the monomial X_{1}, ..., X_{k} as a "Wick polynomial":

$$X_1\dots X_k = \!\! \sum_{S\subseteq\left\{1,\dots,k\right\}}  \!\! \operatorname{E}\left[\textstyle\prod_{i\notin S} X_i\right] \cdot \langle X_i : i \in S \rangle ,$$

where $\langle X_i : i \in S \rangle$ denotes the Wick product $\langle X_{i_1},\dots,X_{i_m} \rangle$ if $S = \left\{i_1,\dots,i_m\right\}.$ This is easily seen to satisfy the inductive definition.

== Examples ==
It follows that

$$\begin{align}
\langle X \rangle =&\ X - \operatorname{E}[X], \\[4pt]
\langle X, Y \rangle =&\ XY - \operatorname{E}[Y] \cdot X - \operatorname{E}[X] \cdot Y + 2(\operatorname{E}[X])(\operatorname{E}[Y]) - \operatorname{E}[XY], \\[4pt]
\langle X,Y,Z\rangle =&\ XYZ \\
&- \operatorname{E}[Y] \cdot XZ \\
&-  \operatorname{E}[Z] \cdot XY \\
&- \operatorname{E}[X] \cdot YZ \\
&+ 2(\operatorname{E}[Y])(\operatorname{E}[Z]) \cdot X \\
&+ 2(\operatorname{E}[X])(\operatorname{E}[Z]) \cdot Y \\
&+ 2(\operatorname{E}[X])(\operatorname{E}[Y]) \cdot Z \\
&- \operatorname{E}[XZ] \cdot Y \\
&- \operatorname{E}[XY] \cdot Z \\
&- \operatorname{E}[YZ] \cdot X \\
&- \operatorname{E}[XYZ]\\
&+ 2\operatorname{E}[XY]\operatorname{E}[Z] \\
&+ 2\operatorname{E}[XZ]\operatorname{E}[Y] \\
&+ 2\operatorname{E}[YZ]\operatorname{E}[X] \\
&- 6(\operatorname{E}[X])(\operatorname{E}[Y])(\operatorname{E}[Z]).
\end{align}$$

== Another notational convention ==
In the notation conventional among physicists, the Wick product is often denoted thus:

$$: X_1, \dots, X_k:\,$$

and the angle-bracket notation

$$\langle X \rangle\,$$

is used to denote the expected value of the random variable X.

== Wick powers ==
The nth Wick power of a random variable X is the Wick product

$$X'^n = \langle X,\dots,X \rangle\,$$

with n factors.

The sequence of polynomials P_{n} such that

$$P_n(X) = \langle X,\dots,X \rangle = X'^n\,$$

form an Appell sequence, i.e. they satisfy the identity

$$P_n'(x) = nP_{n-1}(x),\,$$

for n = 0, 1, 2, ... and P_{0}(x) is a nonzero constant.

For example, it can be shown that if X is uniformly distributed on the interval [0, 1], then

$$X'^n = B_n(X)\,$$

where B_{n} is the nth-degree Bernoulli polynomial. Similarly, if X is normally distributed with variance 1, then

$$X'^n = He_n(X)\,$$

where He_{n} is the nth probabilist's Hermite polynomial.

== Binomial theorem ==
$$(aX+bY)^{'n} = \sum_{i=0}^n {n\choose i}a^ib^{n-i} X^{'i} Y^{'{n-i}}$$

== Wick exponential ==
$$\langle \operatorname{exp}(aX)\rangle \ \stackrel{\mathrm{def}}{=} \ \sum_{i=0}^\infty\frac{a^i}{i!} X^{'i}$$
