= Kampé de Fériet function =

Special function in mathematics

In mathematics, the Kampé de Fériet function is a two-variable generalization of the generalized hypergeometric series, introduced by Joseph Kampé de Fériet.

The Kampé de Fériet function is given by

$${}^{p+q}F_{r+s}\left(
\begin{matrix}
a_1,\cdots,a_p\colon b_1,b_1{}';\cdots;b_q,b_q{}'; \\
c_1,\cdots,c_r\colon d_1,d_1{}';\cdots;d_s,d_s{}';
\end{matrix}
x,y\right)=
\sum_{m=0}^\infty\sum_{n=0}^\infty\frac{(a_1)_{m+n}\cdots(a_p)_{m+n}}{(c_1)_{m+n}\cdots(c_r)_{m+n}}\frac{(b_1)_m(b_1{}')_n\cdots(b_q)_m(b_q{}')_n}{(d_1)_m(d_1{}')_n\cdots(d_s)_m(d_s{}')_n}\cdot\frac{x^my^n}{m!n!}.$$

== See also ==
- Appell series
- Humbert series
- Lauricella series (three-variable)
