= Plancherel–Rotach asymptotics =

Asymptotic values of Hermite or Laguerre polynomials

The Plancherel–Rotach asymptotics are asymptotic results for orthogonal polynomials. They are named after the Swiss mathematicians Michel Plancherel and his PhD student Walter Rotach, who first derived the asymptotics for the Hermite polynomial and Laguerre polynomial. Nowadays asymptotic expansions of this kind for orthogonal polynomials are referred to as Plancherel–Rotach asymptotics or of Plancherel–Rotach type.

The case for the associated Laguerre polynomial was derived by the Swiss mathematician Egon Möcklin, another PhD student of Plancherel and George Pólya at ETH Zurich.

== Hermite polynomials ==
Let $H_n(x)$ denote the n-th Hermite polynomial. Let $\epsilon$ and $\omega$ be positive and fixed, then

- for $x =(2n+1)^{1/2}\cos \varphi$ and $\epsilon \leq \varphi \leq \pi -\epsilon$

$$e^{-x^2/2}H_n(x)
=2^{n/2+1/4}(n!)^{1/2}(\pi n)^{-1/4}(\sin \varphi)^{-1/2}
\bigg\{\sin\left[\left(\tfrac{n}{2}+\tfrac{1}{4}\right)(\sin 2\varphi-2\varphi)+3\tfrac{ \pi}{4}\right]+\mathcal{O}(n^{-1})\bigg\}$$

- for $x =(2n+1)^{1/2}\cosh \varphi$ and $\epsilon \leq \varphi \leq \omega$

$$e^{-x^2/2}H_n(x)
=2^{n/2-3/4}(n!)^{1/2}(\pi n)^{-1/4}(\sinh \varphi)^{-1/2}
\exp\left[\left(\tfrac{n}{2}+\tfrac{1}{4}\right)(2\varphi-\sinh 2\varphi)\right]
\big\{1+\mathcal{O}(n^{-1})\big\}$$

- for $x =(2n+1)^{1/2}-2^{-1/2}3^{-1/3}n^{-1/6}t$ and $t$ complex and bounded

$$e^{-x^2/2}H_n(x)
=3^{1/3}\pi^{-3/4}2^{n/2+1/4}(n!)^{1/2}n^{-1/12}
\bigg\{A(t)+\mathcal{O}\left(n^{-{2/3}}\right)\bigg\}$$

where $A(t) = 3^{-1/3} \pi \operatorname{Ai}(-3^{-1/3}t)$ and $\operatorname{Ai}$ denotes the Airy function.

== Probabalist's Hermite polynomials ==
Let $\operatorname{He}_n(x)$ denote the n-th probabalist's Hermite polynomial. These are related to the (physicist's) Hermite polynomials $H_n(x)$ by the relations $H_n(x)=2^\frac{n}{2} \operatorname{He}_n\left(\sqrt{2} \,x\right), \quad \operatorname{He}_n(x)=2^{-\frac{n}{2}} H_n\left(\frac {x}{\sqrt 2} \right).$

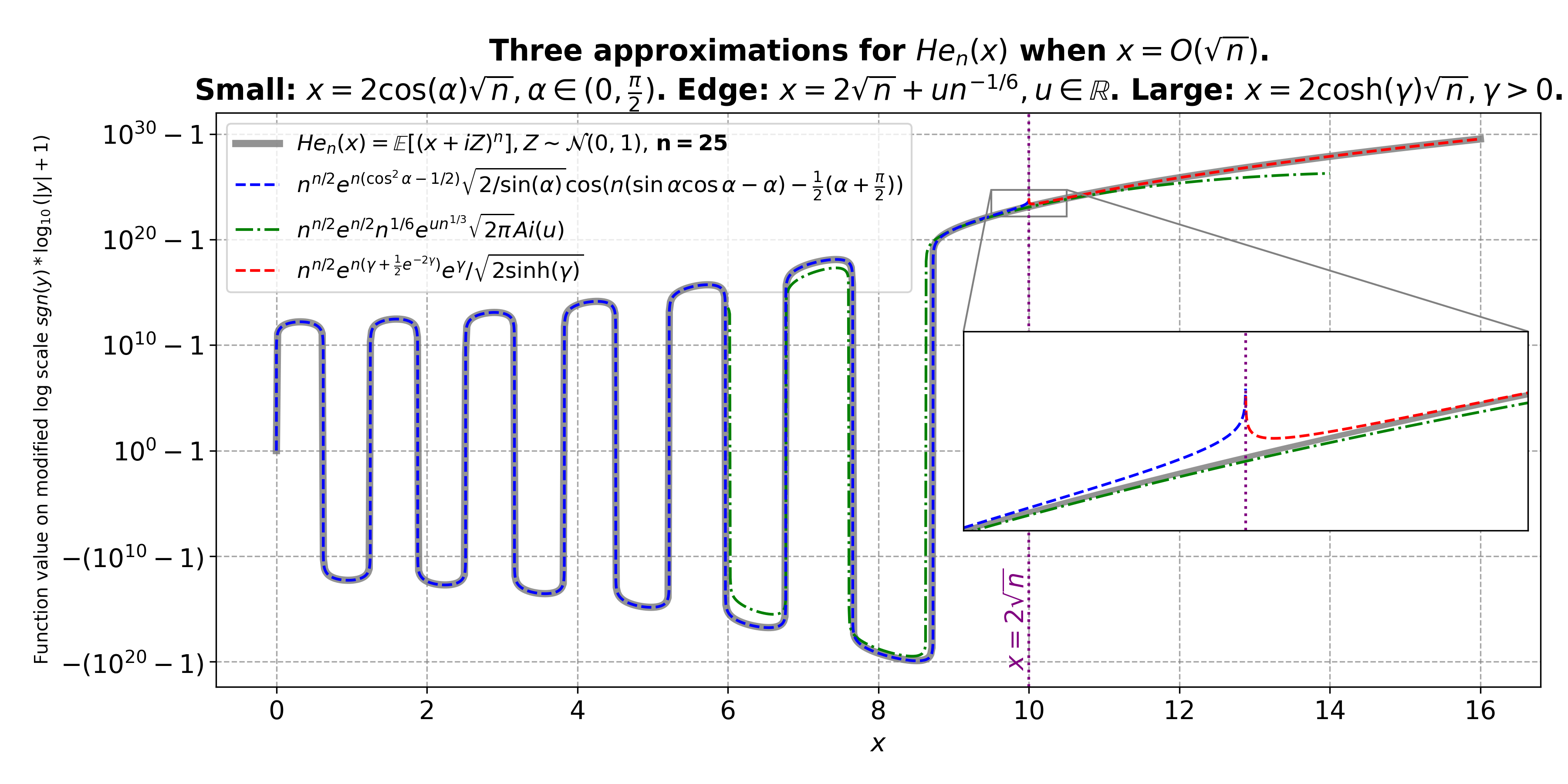
Three approximations for the probabilists Hermite polynomials illustrated when n=25

The Plancherel–Rotach asymptotics for $\operatorname{He}_n(x)$ can be written as:

- [Small $x$ regime] For fixed $\alpha\in (0,\pi/2)$, set $x=2\cos(\alpha)\sqrt{n}$ and then as $n \to \infty$ one has

$$\begin{aligned}
\operatorname{He}_n \left(x \right) &=
\sqrt{\frac{2n^n}{\sin(\alpha)}}
e^{n(\cos^2\alpha-\frac12)}\,
\cos\left(n \left(\sin\alpha\cos\alpha -\alpha\right) -\frac 12\left(\alpha+\frac\pi2\right)\right)\left(1+o(1)\right)
\end{aligned}$$

- [Large x regime] For fixed $\gamma > 0$, set $x=2\cosh(\gamma)\sqrt{n}$. Then as $n \to \infty$ one has
  $$\begin{aligned}
\operatorname{He}_n \left(x \right) &=
n^{n/2}e^{n \left(\gamma+\frac12 e^{-2\gamma}\right)}\, \frac{e^{\gamma/2}}{\sqrt{2\sinh(\gamma)}}
\left(1+o(1)\right).
\end{aligned}$$
- [Edge regime] For fixed $u \in \mathbb{R}$, set $x = 2\sqrt{n} + n^{-1/6}u$. Then as $n \to \infty$ one has

$$\begin{aligned}
\operatorname{He}_n \left(x \right) &=
\sqrt{2\pi} e^{n/2} n^{n/2} n^{1/6} e^{un^{1/3}} \operatorname{Ai}(u) \left(1+o(1)\right).
\end{aligned}$$

== (Associated) Laguerre polynomials ==
Let $L^{(\alpha )}_n(x)$ denote the n-th associate Laguerre polynomial. Let $\alpha$ be arbitrary and real, $\epsilon$ and $\omega$ be positive and fixed, then

- for $x =(4n+2\alpha + 2)\cos^2\varphi$ and $\epsilon\leq \varphi \leq \tfrac{\pi}{2} -\epsilon n^{-1/2}$

$$e^{-x/2}L^{(\alpha )}_n(x)
=(-1)^{n}(\pi \sin \varphi)^{-1/2}x^{-\alpha/2-1/4}n^{\alpha/2-1/4}
\big\{\sin\left[\left(n+\tfrac{\alpha+1}{2}\right)(\sin 2\varphi-2\varphi)+3\pi/4\right] +(nx)^{-1/2}\mathcal{O}(1)\big\}$$

- for $x =(4n+2\alpha + 2)\cosh^2\varphi$ and $\epsilon\leq \varphi \leq \omega$

$$e^{-x/2}L^{(\alpha )}_n(x)
=\tfrac{1}{2}(-1)^{n}(\pi \sinh \varphi )^{-1/2}x^{-\alpha/2-1/4}n^{\alpha /2-1/4}
\exp\left[\left(n+\tfrac{\alpha+1}{2}\right)(2\varphi-\sinh 2\varphi)\right]
\{1+\mathcal{O}\left(n^{-1}\right)\}$$

- for $x =4n+2\alpha + 2 -2(2n/3)^{1/3}t$ and $t$ complex and bounded

$$e^{-x/2}L^{(\alpha)}_n(x)
=(-1)^n\pi^{-1}2^{-\alpha-1/3}3^{1/3}n^{-1/3}
\bigg\{A(t)+\mathcal{O}\left(n^{-2/3}\right)\bigg\}$$

where $A(t) = \pi \operatorname{Ai}(-3^{-1/3}t)$ and $\operatorname{Ai}$ denotes the Airy function.

== Literature ==
- Szegő, Gábor (1975). Orthogonal polynomials. Vol. 4. Providence, Rhode Island: American Mathematical Society. ISBN 0-8218-1023-5.
- Nica, Mihai; Ortmann, Janosch (2026). "A Gaussian integral formula for the Hermite polynomials: Combinatorics, asymptotics and applications". Probability Surveys. 23. Institute of Mathematical Statistics and Bernoulli Society: 255–343. doi:10.1214/26-PS37.
