= Appell sequence =

Type of polynomial sequence

In mathematics, an Appell sequence, named after Paul Émile Appell, is any polynomial sequence $\{p_n(x)\}_{n=0,1,2,\ldots}$ satisfying the identity

$$\frac{d}{dx} p_n(x) = np_{n-1}(x),$$

and in which $p_0(x)$ is a non-zero constant.

Among the most notable Appell sequences besides the trivial example $\{x^n\}$ are the Hermite polynomials, the Bernoulli polynomials, and the Euler polynomials. Every Appell sequence is a Sheffer sequence, but most Sheffer sequences are not Appell sequences. Appell sequences have a probabilistic interpretation as systems of moments.

== Equivalent characterizations of Appell sequences ==
The following conditions on polynomial sequences can easily be seen to be equivalent:

- For $n = 1, 2, 3,\ldots$,

$$\frac{d}{dx} p_n(x) = n p_{n-1}(x)$$

and $p_0(x)$ is a non-zero constant;

- For some sequence $\{c_{n}\}_{n=0}^{\infty}$ of scalars with $c_0 \neq 0$,

$$p_n(x) = \sum_{k=0}^n \binom{n}{k} c_k x^{n-k};$$

- For the same sequence of scalars,

$$p_n(x) = \left(\sum_{k=0}^\infty \frac{c_k}{k!} D^k\right) x^n,$$

where

$$D = \frac{d}{dx};$$

- For $n=0,1,2,\ldots$,

$$p_n(x+y) = \sum_{k=0}^n \binom{n}{k} p_k(x) y^{n-k}.$$

== Recursion formula ==
Suppose

$$p_n(x) = \left(\sum_{k=0}^\infty {c_k \over k!} D^k\right) x^n = Sx^n,$$

where the last equality is taken to define the linear operator $S$ on the space of polynomials in $x$. Let

$$T = S^{-1} = \left(\sum_{k=0}^\infty \frac{c_k}{k!} D^k\right)^{-1} = \sum_{k=1}^\infty \frac{a_k}{k!} D^k$$

be the inverse operator, the coefficients $a_k$ being those of the usual reciprocal of a formal power series, so that

$$Tp_n(x) = x^n.\,$$

In the conventions of the umbral calculus, one often treats this formal power series $T$ as representing the Appell sequence $p_n$. One can define

$$\log T = \log\left(\sum_{k=0}^\infty \frac{a_k}{k!} D^k \right)$$

by using the usual power series expansion of the $\log(x)$ and the usual definition of composition of formal power series. Then we have

$$p_{n+1}(x) = (x - (\log T)')p_n(x).\,$$

(This formal differentiation of a power series in the differential operator $D$ is an instance of Pincherle differentiation.)

In the case of Hermite polynomials, this reduces to the conventional recursion formula for that sequence.

== Subgroup of the Sheffer polynomials ==
The set of all Appell sequences is closed under the operation of umbral composition of polynomial sequences, defined as follows. Suppose $\{p_n(x) \colon n=0,1,2,\ldots\}$ and $\{q_n(x) \colon n=0,1,2,\ldots\}$ are polynomial sequences, given by

$$p_n(x)=\sum_{k=0}^n a_{n,k}x^k \text{ and } q_n(x)=\sum_{k=0}^n b_{n,k}x^k.$$

Then the umbral composition $p \circ q$ is the polynomial sequence whose $n$th term is

$$(p_n\circ q)(x)=\sum_{k=0}^n a_{n,k}q_k(x)=\sum_{0\le \ell \le k \le n} a_{n,k}b_{k,\ell}x^\ell$$

(the subscript $n$ appears in $p_n$, since this is the $n$th term of that sequence, but not in $q$, since this refers to the sequence as a whole rather than one of its terms).

Under this operation, the set of all Sheffer sequences is a non-abelian group, but the set of all Appell sequences is an abelian subgroup. That it is abelian can be seen by considering the fact that every Appell sequence is of the form

$$p_n(x) = \left(\sum_{k=0}^\infty \frac{c_k}{k!} D^k\right) x^n,$$

and that umbral composition of Appell sequences corresponds to multiplication of these formal power series in the operator $D$.

== Different convention ==
Another convention followed by some authors (see Chihara) defines this concept in a different way, conflicting with Appell's original definition, by using the identity

$${d \over dx} p_n(x) = p_{n-1}(x)$$

instead.

== Hypergeometric Appell polynomials ==
The enormous class of Appell polynomials can be obtained in terms of the generalized hypergeometric function.

Let $\Delta(k,-n)$ denote the array of $k$ ratios

$$-\frac{n}{k}, -\frac{n-1}{k}, \ldots, -\frac{n-k+1}{k}, \quad n \in {\mathbb{N}}_0,k \in \mathbb{N}.$$

Consider the polynomial $A_{n,p,q}^{(k)}(a,b;m,x) = x^n {}_{k+p} F_q\left({a_1}, {a_2}, \ldots, {a_p}, \Delta(k,-n);{b_1}, {b_2}, \ldots, {b_q};\frac{m}{x^k} \right), \quad n, m \in \mathbb{N}_0, k \in \mathbb{N}$

where ${}_{k+p}F_q$ is the generalized hypergeometric function.

Theorem. The polynomial family $\{A_{n,p,q}^{(k)}(a,b; m,x)\}$ is the Appell sequence for any natural parameters $a, b, p,q,m,k$.

For example, if $p=0, q=0,$ $k=m,$ $m=(-1)^k h{k^k}$ then the polynomials $A_{n,p,q}^{(k)}(m,x)$ become the Gould-Hopper polynomials $g_n^m(x,h)$ and if $p=0, q=0, m=-2, k=2$ they become the Hermite polynomials $H_n(x)$.

== See also ==
- Sheffer sequence
- Umbral calculus
- Generalized Appell polynomials
- Wick product
