= Hermite number =

In mathematics, Hermite numbers are values of Hermite polynomials at zero argument. Typically they are defined for physicists' Hermite polynomials.

== Formal definition ==
The numbers H_{n} = H_{n}(0), where H_{n}(x) is a Hermite polynomial of order n, may be called Hermite numbers.

The first Hermite numbers are:

$$H_0 = 1\,$$
$$H_1 = 0\,$$
$$H_2 = -2\,$$
$$H_3 = 0\,$$
$$H_4 = +12\,$$
$$H_5 = 0\,$$
$$H_6 = -120\,$$
$$H_7 = 0\,$$
$$H_8 = +1680\,$$
$$H_9 =0\,$$
$$H_{10} = -30240\,$$

== Recursion relations ==
Are obtained from recursion relations of Hermitian polynomials for x = 0:

$$H_{n} = -2(n-1)H_{n-2}.\,\!$$

Since H_{0} = 1 and H_{1} = 0 one can construct a closed formula for H_{n}:

$$H_n =
\begin{cases}
0,  & \mbox{if }n\mbox{ is odd} \\
(-1)^{n/2} 2^{n/2} (n-1)!! , & \mbox{if }n\mbox{ is even}
\end{cases}$$

where (n − 1)!! = 1 × 3 × ... × (n − 1).

== Usage ==
From the generating function of Hermitian polynomials it follows that

$$\exp (-t^2 + 2tx) = \sum_{n=0}^\infty H_n (x) \frac {t^n}{n!}\,\!$$

Reference gives a formal power series:

$$H_n (x) = (H+2x)^n\,\!$$

where formally the n-th power of H, H^{n}, is the n-th Hermite number, H_{n}. (See Umbral calculus.)
