= Appell series =

Set of four hypergeometric series

In mathematics, Appell series are a set of four hypergeometric series F_{1}, F_{2}, F_{3}, F_{4} of two variables that were introduced by Paul Appell (1880) and that generalize Gauss's hypergeometric series _{2}F_{1} of one variable. Appell established the set of partial differential equations of which these functions are solutions, and found various reduction formulas and expressions of these series in terms of hypergeometric series of one variable.

== Definitions ==
The Appell series F_{1} is defined for |x| < 1, |y| < 1 by the double series

$$F_1(a,b_1,b_2;c;x,y) = \sum_{m,n=0}^\infty \frac{(a)_{m+n} (b_1)_m (b_2)_n} {(c)_{m+n} \,m! \,n!} \,x^m y^n ~,$$

where $(q)_n$ is the rising factorial Pochhammer symbol. For other values of x and y the function F_{1} can be defined by analytic continuation. It can be shown that

$$F_1(a,b_1,b_2;c;x,y) = \sum_{r=0}^\infty \frac{(a)_r (b_1)_r (b_2)_r (c-a)_r} {(c+r-1)_r (c)_{2r} r!} \,x^r y^r {}_2F_{1}\left(a+r,b_1+r;c+2r;x\right){}_2F_{1}\left(a+r,b_2+r;c+2r;y\right)~.$$

Similarly, the function F_{2} is defined for |x| + |y| < 1 by the series

$$F_2(a,b_1,b_2;c_1,c_2;x,y) = \sum_{m,n=0}^\infty \frac{(a)_{m+n} (b_1)_m (b_2)_n} {(c_1)_m (c_2)_n \,m! \,n!} \,x^m y^n$$

and it can be shown that

$$F_2(a,b_1,b_2;c_1,c_2;x,y) = \sum_{r=0}^\infty \frac{(a)_r (b_1)_r (b_2)_r} {(c_1)_r (c_2)_r r!} \,x^r y^r {}_2F_{1}\left(a+r,b_1+r;c_1+r;x\right){}_2F_{1}\left(a+r,b_2+r;c_2+r;y\right)~.$$

Also the function F_{3} for |x| < 1, |y| < 1 can be defined by the series

$$F_3(a_1,a_2,b_1,b_2;c;x,y) = \sum_{m,n=0}^\infty \frac{(a_1)_m (a_2)_n (b_1)_m (b_2)_n} {(c)_{m+n} \,m! \,n!} \,x^m y^n ~,$$

and the function F_{4} for |x|^{1/2} + |y|^{1/2} < 1 by the series

$$F_4(a,b;c_1,c_2;x,y) = \sum_{m,n=0}^\infty \frac{(a)_{m+n} (b)_{m+n}} {(c_1)_m (c_2)_n \,m! \,n!} \,x^m y^n ~.$$

The four series can each be represented as a simple series where the elements are Gaussian hypergeometric functions in terms of y:

$$F_1(a, b_1, b_2; c; x, y) =
\sum_{r=0}^\infty \frac{(a)_r (b_1)_r}{(c)_r \,r!} \, x^r
{}_2F_1(a+r, b_2, c+r, y) ~,$$

$$F_2(a, b_1, b_2; c_1, c_2; x, y) =
\sum_{r=0}^\infty \frac{(a)_r (b_1)_r}{(c_1)_r \,r!} \, x^r
{}_2F_1(a+r, b_2, c_2, y) ~,$$

$$F_3(a_1, a_2, b_1, b_2; c; x, y) =
\sum_{r=0}^\infty \frac{(a_1)_r (b_1)_r}{(c)_r \,r!} \, x^r
{}_2F_1(a_2, b_2, c+r, y) ~,$$

$$F_4(a, b; c_1, c_2; x, y) =
\sum_{r=0}^\infty \frac{(a)_r (b)_r}{(c_1)_r \,r!} \, x^r
{}_2F_1(a+r, b+r, c_2, y) ~.$$

Similar expressions can be obtained upon exchange of the variables x and y and their respective parameters, e.g., c_{1} and c_{2} for F_{4}.

== Recurrence relations ==
Like the Gauss hypergeometric series _{2}F_{1}, the Appell double series entail recurrence relations among contiguous functions. For example, a basic set of such relations for Appell's F_{1} is given by:

$$(a-b_1-b_2) F_1(a,b_1,b_2,c; x,y) - a \,F_1(a+1,b_1,b_2,c; x,y) + b_1 F_1(a,b_1+1,b_2,c; x,y) + b_2 F_1(a,b_1,b_2+1,c; x,y) = 0 ~,$$

$$c \,F_1(a,b_1,b_2,c; x,y) - (c-a) F_1(a,b_1,b_2,c+1; x,y) - a \,F_1(a+1,b_1,b_2,c+1; x,y) = 0 ~,$$

$$c \,F_1(a,b_1,b_2,c; x,y) + c(x-1) F_1(a,b_1+1,b_2,c; x,y) - (c-a)x \,F_1(a,b_1+1,b_2,c+1; x,y) = 0 ~,$$

$$c \,F_1(a,b_1,b_2,c; x,y) + c(y-1) F_1(a,b_1,b_2+1,c; x,y) - (c-a)y \,F_1(a,b_1,b_2+1,c+1; x,y) = 0 ~.$$

Any other relation valid for F_{1} can be derived from these four.

Similarly, all recurrence relations for Appell's F_{3} follow from this set of five:

$$c \,F_3(a_1,a_2,b_1,b_2,c; x,y) + (a_1+a_2-c) F_3(a_1,a_2,b_1,b_2,c+1; x,y) - a_1 F_3(a_1+1,a_2,b_1,b_2,c+1; x,y) - a_2 F_3(a_1,a_2+1,b_1,b_2,c+1; x,y) = 0 ~,$$

$$c \,F_3(a_1,a_2,b_1,b_2,c; x,y) - c \,F_3(a_1+1,a_2,b_1,b_2,c; x,y) + b_1 x \,F_3(a_1+1,a_2,b_1+1,b_2,c+1; x,y) = 0 ~,$$

$$c \,F_3(a_1,a_2,b_1,b_2,c; x,y) - c \,F_3(a_1,a_2+1,b_1,b_2,c; x,y) + b_2 y \,F_3(a_1,a_2+1,b_1,b_2+1,c+1; x,y) = 0 ~,$$

$$c \,F_3(a_1,a_2,b_1,b_2,c; x,y) - c \,F_3(a_1,a_2,b_1+1,b_2,c; x,y) + a_1 x \,F_3(a_1+1,a_2,b_1+1,b_2,c+1; x,y) = 0 ~,$$

$$c \,F_3(a_1,a_2,b_1,b_2,c; x,y) - c \,F_3(a_1,a_2,b_1,b_2+1,c; x,y) + a_2 y \,F_3(a_1,a_2+1,b_1,b_2+1,c+1; x,y) = 0 ~.$$

== Derivatives and differential equations ==
For Appell's F_{1}, the following derivatives result from the definition by a double series:

$$\frac {\partial^n} {\partial x^n} F_1(a,b_1,b_2,c; x,y) = \frac {\left(a\right)_n \left(b_1\right)_n} {\left(c\right)_n} F_1(a+n,b_1+n,b_2,c+n; x,y)$$

$$\frac {\partial^n} {\partial y^n} F_1(a,b_1,b_2,c; x,y) = \frac {\left(a\right)_n \left(b_2\right)_n} {\left(c\right)_n} F_1(a+n,b_1,b_2+n,c+n; x,y)$$

From its definition, Appell's F_{1} is further found to satisfy the following system of second-order differential equations:

$$x(1-x) \frac {\partial^2F_1(x,y)} {\partial x^2} + y(1-x) \frac {\partial^2F_1(x,y)}
{\partial x \partial y} + [c - (a+b_1+1) x] \frac {\partial F_1(x,y)} {\partial x} - b_1 y
\frac {\partial F_1(x,y)} {\partial y} - a b_1 F_1(x,y) = 0$$

$$y(1-y) \frac {\partial^2F_1(x,y)} {\partial y^2} + x(1-y) \frac {\partial^2F_1(x,y)}
{\partial x \partial y} + [c - (a+b_2+1) y] \frac {\partial F_1(x,y)} {\partial y} - b_2 x
\frac {\partial F_1(x,y)} {\partial x} - a b_2 F_1(x,y)= 0$$

A system partial differential equations for F_{2} is

$$x(1-x) \frac {\partial^2F_2(x,y)} {\partial x^2} - xy \frac {\partial^2F_2(x,y)}
{\partial x \partial y} + [c_1 - (a+b_1+1) x] \frac {\partial F_2(x,y)} {\partial x} -b_1 y \frac {\partial F_2(x,y)} {\partial y}-
a b_1 F_2(x,y) = 0$$

$$y(1-y) \frac {\partial^2F_2(x,y)} {\partial y^2} - xy \frac {\partial^2F_2(x,y)}
{\partial x \partial y} + [c_2 - (a+b_2+1) y] \frac {\partial F_2(x,y)} {\partial y} -b_2 x \frac {\partial F_2(x,y)} {\partial x}-
a b_2 F_2(x,y) = 0$$

The system have solution

$$F_2(x,y)=C_1F_2(a,b_1,b_2,c_1,c_2;x,y)+C_2x^{1-c_1}F_2(a-c_1+1,b_1-c_1+1,b_2,2-c_1,c_2;x,y)+C_3y^{1-c_2}F_2(a-c_2+1,b_1,b_2-c_2+1,c_1,2-c_2;x,y)+C_4x^{1-c_1}y^{1-c_2}F_2(a-c_1-c_2+2,b_1-c_1+1,b_2-c_2+1,2-c_1,2-c_2;x,y)$$

Similarly, for F_{3} the following derivatives result from the definition:

$$\frac {\partial} {\partial x} F_3(a_1,a_2,b_1,b_2,c; x,y) = \frac {a_1 b_1} {c} F_3(a_1+1,a_2,b_1+1,b_2,c+1; x,y)$$

$$\frac {\partial} {\partial y} F_3(a_1,a_2,b_1,b_2,c; x,y) = \frac {a_2 b_2} {c} F_3(a_1,a_2+1,b_1,b_2+1,c+1; x,y)$$

And for F_{3} the following system of differential equations is obtained:

$$x(1-x) \frac {\partial^2F_3(x,y)} {\partial x^2} + y \frac {\partial^2F_3(x,y)}
{\partial x \partial y} + [c - (a_1+b_1+1) x] \frac {\partial F_3(x,y)} {\partial x} -
a_1 b_1 F_3(x,y) = 0$$

$$y(1-y) \frac {\partial^2F_3(x,y)} {\partial y^2} + x \frac {\partial^2F_3(x,y)}
{\partial x \partial y} + [c - (a_2+b_2+1) y] \frac {\partial F_3(x,y)} {\partial y} -
a_2 b_2 F_3(x,y) = 0$$

A system partial differential equations for F_{4} is

$$x(1-x) \frac {\partial^2F_4(x,y)} {\partial x^2} - y^2 \frac {\partial^2F_4(x,y)}
{\partial y^2} -2xy\frac {\partial^2F_4(x,y)} {\partial x \partial y}+[c_1 - (a+b+1) x] \frac {\partial F_4(x,y)} {\partial x} - (a+b+1) y \frac {\partial F_4(x,y)} {\partial y}-a b F_4(x,y)= 0$$

$$y(1-y) \frac {\partial^2F_4(x,y)} {\partial y^2} - x^2 \frac {\partial^2F_4(x,y)}
{\partial x^2} -2xy\frac {\partial^2F_4(x,y)} {\partial x \partial y}+[c_2 - (a+b+1) y] \frac {\partial F_4(x,y)} {\partial y} - (a+b+1) x \frac {\partial F_4(x,y)} {\partial x}-a b F_4(x,y)= 0$$

The system has solution

$$F_4(x,y)=C_1F_4(a,b,c_1,c_2;x,y)+C_2x^{1-c_1}F_4(a-c_1+1,b-c_1+1,2-c_1,c_2;x,y)+C_3y^{1-c_2}F_4(a-c_2+1,b-c_2+1,c_1,2-c_2;x,y)+C_4x^{1-c_1}y^{1-c_2}F_4(2+a-c_1-c_2,2+b-c_1-c_2,2-c_1,2-c_2;x,y)$$

== Integral representations ==
The four functions defined by Appell's double series can be represented in terms of double integrals involving elementary functions only (Gradshteyn et al. 2015, §9.184). However, Émile Picard (1881) discovered that Appell's F_{1} can also be written as a one-dimensional Euler-type integral:

$$F_1(a,b_1,b_2,c; x,y) = \frac{\Gamma(c)} {\Gamma(a)\Gamma(c-a)}
\int_0^1 t^{a-1} (1-t)^{c-a-1} (1-xt)^{-b_1} (1-yt)^{-b_2} \,\mathrm{d}t,
\quad \real \,c > \real \,a > 0 ~.$$

This representation can be verified by means of Taylor expansion of the integrand, followed by termwise integration.

Interestingly, from p. 4 of Y. Brychkov and N. Saad's 2015 paper, "On some formulas for the Appell function F_{3}(a,a',b,b';c;w,z)", Appell's F_{3} function has the following one-dimensional integral representation in terms of two Gauss hypergeometric functions:

$$F_3(a,a',b,b';c;w,z)=\frac{\Gamma(c)}{\Gamma(c')\Gamma(c-c')}\int_0^1 t^{c'-1}(1-t)^{c-c'-1}{_2F_1}(a,b;c';wt)\,{_2F_1}(a',b';c-c';z(1-t))\,\mathrm dt,$$

where

$$(a,a',b,b',c,c',w,z)\in\mathbb C\land c\notin\mathbb Z^{(-,0)}\land |w|<1\land |z|<1\land \Re c>\Re c'>0.$$

== Special cases ==
Picard's integral representation implies that the incomplete elliptic integrals F and E as well as the complete elliptic integral Π are special cases of Appell's F_{1}:

$$F(\phi,k) = \int_0^\phi \frac{\mathrm{d} \theta}
{\sqrt{1 - k^2 \sin^2 \theta}} = \sin (\phi) \,F_1(\tfrac 1 2, \tfrac 1 2, \tfrac 1 2, \tfrac 3 2; \sin^2 \phi, k^2 \sin^2 \phi), \quad |\real \,\phi| < \frac \pi 2 ~,$$

$$E(\phi, k) = \int_0^\phi \sqrt{1 - k^2 \sin^2 \theta} \,\mathrm{d} \theta = \sin (\phi) \,F_1(\tfrac 1 2, \tfrac 1 2, -\tfrac 1 2, \tfrac 3 2; \sin^2 \phi, k^2 \sin^2 \phi), \quad |\real \,\phi| < \frac \pi 2 ~,$$

$$\Pi(n,k) = \int_0^{\pi/2} \frac{\mathrm{d} \theta} {(1 - n \sin^2 \theta)
\sqrt{1 - k^2 \sin^2 \theta}} = \frac {\pi} {2} \,F_1(\tfrac 1 2, 1, \tfrac 1 2, 1;
n,k^2) ~.$$

Furthermore, the above stated integral representation of Appell's F_{3} function gives us:

$$\int_0^x t(a^2\pm t^2)^{\beta}\arcsin(bt)\,\mathrm dt=\frac13 bx^3(a^2\pm x^2)^{\beta}{F_3}\left(-\beta,\frac12,1,\frac12;\frac52;\frac{x^2}{x^2\pm a^2},b^2 x^2\right)$$

$$\int_0^x\frac{t(a^2\pm t^2)^{\beta}}{\sqrt{1-b^2t^2}}\arcsin(bt)\,\mathrm dt=\frac13 bx^3(a^2\pm x^2)^{\beta}{F_3}\left(-\beta,1,1,1;\frac52;\frac{a^2}{x^2\pm a^2},b^2 x^2\right)$$

$$\int_0^a K(b\sqrt t) K(c\sqrt{a-t})\,\mathrm dt=\frac{\pi^2 a}{4}{F_3}\left(\frac12,\frac12,\frac12,\frac12;2;ac^2,ab^2\right)$$

$$\int_0^a E(c\sqrt t) K(b\sqrt{a-t})\,\mathrm dt=\frac{\pi^2 a}{4}{F_3}\left(\frac12,-\frac12,\frac12,\frac12;2;ab^2,ac^2\right)$$

$$\int_0^a \frac{E(c\sqrt t) K(b\sqrt{a-t})}{1-c^2t}\,\mathrm dt=\frac{\pi^2 a}{4}{F_3}\left(\frac12,\frac12,\frac12,\frac32;2;ab^2,ac^2\right)$$

$$\int_0^a E(b\sqrt t) E(c\sqrt{a-t})\,\mathrm dt=\frac{\pi^2 a}{4}{F_3}\left(-\frac12,-\frac12,\frac12,\frac12;2;ac^2,ab^2\right)$$

$$\int_0^a \frac{E(b\sqrt t) E(c\sqrt{a-t})}{1-b^2t}\,\mathrm dt=\frac{\pi^2 a}{4}{F_3}\left(-\frac12,\frac12,\frac12,\frac32;2;ac^2,ab^2\right)$$

$$\int_0^a \frac{E(b\sqrt t) E(c\sqrt{a-t})}{(1-b^2t)(1-c^2(a-t))}\,\mathrm dt=\frac{\pi^2 a}{4}{F_3}\left(\frac12,\frac12,\frac32,\frac32;2;ac^2,ab^2\right)$$

where $K(k)$ and $E(k)$ represent the complete elliptic integrals of the first and second kind, respectively.

== Related series ==
- There are seven related series of two variables, Φ_{1}, Φ_{2}, Φ_{3}, Ψ_{1}, Ψ_{2}, Ξ_{1}, and Ξ_{2}, which generalize Kummer's confluent hypergeometric function _{1}F_{1} of one variable and the confluent hypergeometric limit function _{0}F_{1} of one variable in a similar manner. The first of these was introduced by Pierre Humbert in 1920.
- Giuseppe Lauricella (1893) defined four functions similar to the Appell series, but depending on many variables rather than just the two variables x and y. These series were also studied by Appell. They satisfy certain partial differential equations, and can also be given in terms of Euler-type integrals and contour integrals.
