= Parabolic cylinder function =

Concept in mathematics

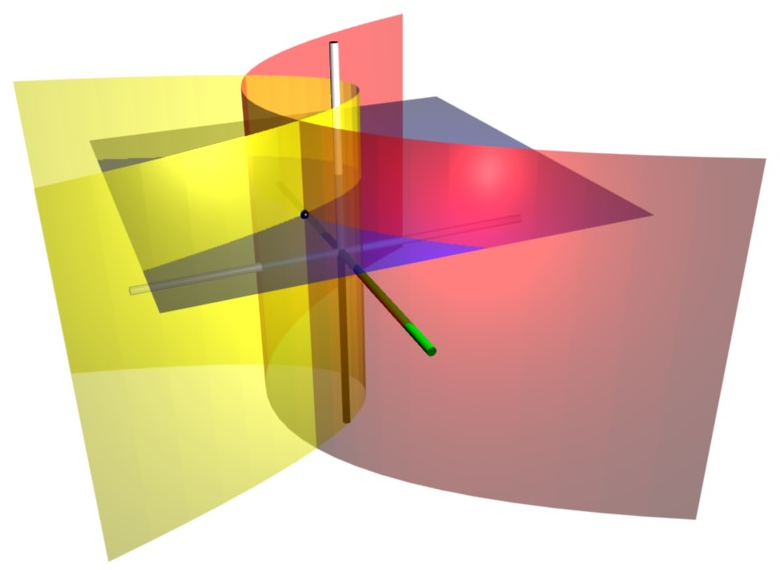
Coordinate surfaces of parabolic cylindrical coordinates. Parabolic cylinder functions occur when separation of variables is used on Laplace's equation in these coordinates

Plot of the parabolic cylinder function D_{ν}(z) with ν = 5 in the complex plane from −2 − 2i to 2 + 2i

In mathematics, the parabolic cylinder functions are special functions defined as solutions to the differential equation

| $\frac{d^2f}{dz^2} + \left(\tilde{a}z^2+\tilde{b}z+\tilde{c}\right)f=0.$ | 1 |

This equation is found when the technique of separation of variables is used on Laplace's equation when expressed in parabolic cylindrical coordinates.

The above equation may be brought into two distinct forms (A) and (B) by completing the square and rescaling z, called H. F. Weber's equations:

| $\frac{d^2f}{dz^2} - \left(\tfrac14z^2+a\right)f=0$ | A |

and

| $\frac{d^2f}{dz^2} + \left(\tfrac14z^2-a\right)f=0.$ | B |

If
$$f(a,z)$$
is a solution, then so are
$$f(a,-z), f(-a,iz)\text{ and  }f(-a,-iz).$$

If
$$f(a,z)\,$$
is a solution of equation (A), then
$$f(-ia,ze^{(1/4)\pi i})$$
is a solution of (B), and, by symmetry,
$$f(-ia,-ze^{(1/4)\pi i}), f(ia,-ze^{-(1/4)\pi i})\text{ and }f(ia,ze^{-(1/4)\pi i})$$
are also solutions of (B).

== Solutions ==
There are independent even and odd solutions of the form (A). These are given by (following the notation of Abramowitz and Stegun (1965)):
$$y_1(a;z) = \exp(-z^2/4) \;_1F_1
\left(\tfrac12a+\tfrac14; \;
\tfrac12\; ; \; \frac{z^2}{2}\right)\,\,\,\,\,\, (\mathrm{even})$$
and
$$y_2(a;z) = z\exp(-z^2/4) \;_1F_1
\left(\tfrac12a+\tfrac34; \;
\tfrac32\; ; \; \frac{z^2}{2}\right)\,\,\,\,\,\, (\mathrm{odd})$$
where $\;_1F_1 (a;b;z)=M(a;b;z)$ is the confluent hypergeometric function.

Other pairs of independent solutions may be formed from linear combinations of the above solutions. One such pair is based upon their behavior at infinity:
$$U(a,z)=\frac{1}{2^\xi\sqrt{\pi}}
\left[
\cos(\xi\pi)\Gamma(1/2-\xi)\,y_1(a,z)
-\sqrt{2}\sin(\xi\pi)\Gamma(1-\xi)\,y_2(a,z)
\right]$$
$$V(a,z)=\frac{1}{2^\xi\sqrt{\pi}\Gamma[1/2-a]}
\left[
\sin(\xi\pi)\Gamma(1/2-\xi)\,y_1(a,z)
+\sqrt{2}\cos(\xi\pi)\Gamma(1-\xi)\,y_2(a,z)
\right]$$
where
$$\xi = \frac{1}{2}a+\frac{1}{4} .$$

The function U(a, z) approaches zero for large values of z and |arg(z)| < π/2, while V(a, z) diverges for large values of positive real z.
$$\lim_{z\to\infty}U(a,z)/\left(e^{-z^2/4}z^{-a-1/2}\right)=1\,\,\,\,(\text{for}\,\left|\arg(z)\right|<\pi/2)$$
and
$$\lim_{z\to\infty}V(a,z)/\left(\sqrt{\frac{2}{\pi}}e^{z^2/4}z^{a-1/2}\right)=1\,\,\,\,(\text{for}\,\arg(z)=0) .$$

For half-integer values of a, these (that is, U and V) can be re-expressed in terms of Hermite polynomials; alternatively, they can also be expressed in terms of Bessel functions.

The functions U and V can also be related to the functions D_{p}(x) (a notation dating back to Whittaker (1902)) that are themselves sometimes called parabolic cylinder functions:
$$\begin{align}
U(a,x) &= D_{-a-\tfrac12}(x), \\
V(a,x) &= \frac{\Gamma(\tfrac12+a)}{\pi}[\sin( \pi a) D_{-a-\tfrac12}(x)+D_{-a-\tfrac12}(-x)] .
\end{align}$$

Function D_{a}(z) was introduced by Whittaker and Watson as a solution of eq.~(1) with $\tilde a=-\frac14, \tilde b=0, \tilde c=a+\frac12$ bounded at $+\infty$. It can be expressed in terms of confluent hypergeometric functions as

$$D_a(z)=\frac{1}{\sqrt{\pi }}{2^{a/2} e^{-\frac{z^2}{4}} \left(\cos \left(\frac{\pi  a}{2}\right) \Gamma \left(\frac{a+1}{2}\right) \, _1F_1\left(-\frac{a}{2};\frac{1}{2};\frac{z^2}{2}\right)+\sqrt{2} z \sin \left(\frac{\pi  a}{2}\right) \Gamma \left(\frac{a}{2}+1\right) \, _1F_1\left(\frac{1}{2}-\frac{a}{2};\frac{3}{2};\frac{z^2}{2}\right)\right)}.$$

Power series for this function have been obtained by Abadir (1993).

== Parabolic Cylinder U(a,z) function ==
=== Integral representation ===
Integrals along the real line,
$$U(a,z)=\frac{e^{-\frac14 z^2}}{\Gamma\left(a+\frac12\right)}
\int_0^\infty e^{-zt}t^{a-\frac12}e^{-\frac12 t^2}dt
\,,\; \Re a>-\frac12 \;,$$
$$U(a,z)=\sqrt{\frac2{\pi}}e^{\frac14 z^2}
\int_0^\infty \cos\left(zt+\frac{\pi}{2}a+\frac{\pi}{4}\right)
t^{-a-\frac12}e^{-\frac12 t^2}dt
\,,\; \Re a<\frac12 \;.$$
The fact that these integrals are solutions to equation (A) can be easily checked by direct substitution.

=== Derivative ===
Differentiating the integrals with respect to $z$ gives two expressions for $U'(a,z)$,
$$U'(a,z)=-\frac{z}{2}U(a,z)-
\frac{e^{-\frac14 z^2}}{\Gamma\left(a+\frac12\right)}
\int_0^\infty e^{-zt}t^{a+\frac12}e^{-\frac12 t^2}dt
=-\frac{z}{2}U(a,z)-\left(a+\frac12\right)U(a+1,z) \;,$$
$$U'(a,z)=\frac{z}{2}U(a,z)-
\sqrt{\frac2{\pi}}e^{\frac14 z^2}
\int_0^\infty \sin\left(zt+\frac{\pi}{2}a+\frac{\pi}{4}\right)
t^{-a+\frac12}e^{-\frac12 t^2}dt
= \frac{z}{2}U(a,z)-U(a-1,z) \;.$$
Adding the two gives another expression for the derivative,
$$2U'(a,z) = -\left(a+\frac12\right)U(a+1,z)-U(a-1,z)
\;.$$

=== Recurrence relation ===
Subtracting the first two expressions for the derivative gives the recurrence relation,
$$zU(a,z) = U(a-1,z) - \left(a+\frac12\right)U(a+1,z) \;.$$

=== Asymptotic expansion ===
Expanding
$$e^{-\frac12 t^2}=1-\frac12 t^2+\frac18 t^4 - \dots \;$$
in the integrand of the integral representation gives the asymptotic expansion of $U(a,z)$,
$$U(a,z) = e^{-\frac14 z^2}z^{-a-\frac12}\left(1
- \frac{(a+\frac12)(a+\frac32)}{2}\frac{1}{z^2}
+ \frac{(a+\frac12)(a+\frac32)(a+\frac52)(a+\frac72)}{8}\frac{1}{z^4}
- \dots\right) .$$

=== Power series ===
Expanding the integral representation in powers of $z$ gives
$$U(a,z)=\frac{\sqrt{\pi}\,2^{-\frac{a}{2}-\frac14}}{\Gamma\left(\frac{a}{2}+\frac34\right)}
-\frac{\sqrt{\pi}\,2^{-\frac{a}{2}+\frac14}}{\Gamma\left(\frac{a}{2}+\frac14\right)}z
+\frac{\sqrt{\pi}\,2^{-\frac{a}{2}-\frac54}}{\Gamma\left(\frac{a}{2}+\frac34\right)}z^2 - \dots \;.$$

=== Values at z=0 ===
From the power series one immediately gets
$$U(a,0)=\frac{\sqrt{\pi}\,2^{-\frac{a}{2}-\frac14}}{\Gamma\left(\frac{a}{2}+\frac34\right)} \;,$$
$$U'(a,0)=-\frac{\sqrt{\pi}\,2^{-\frac{a}{2}+\frac14}}{\Gamma\left(\frac{a}{2}+\frac14\right)} \;.$$

== Parabolic cylinder D_{ν}(z) function ==
Parabolic cylinder function $D_\nu(z)$ is the solution to the Weber differential equation,
$$u''+\left(\nu+\frac12-\frac{1}{4} z^2 \right)u=0 \,,$$
that is regular at $\Re z\to +\infty$ with the asymptotics
$$D_\nu(z) \to e^{-\frac14 z^2}z^\nu \,.$$
It is thus given as $D_\nu(z)=U(-\nu-1/2,z)$ and its properties then directly follow from those of the $U$-function.

=== Integral representation ===
$$D_\nu(z)=\frac{e^{-\frac14 z^2}}{\Gamma(-\nu)}
\int_0^\infty e^{-zt} t^{-\nu -1} e^{-\frac12 t^2}dt
\,,\; \Re \nu < 0 \,,\; \Re z > 0\;,$$
$$D_\nu(z)=\sqrt{\frac2{\pi}}e^{\frac14 z^2}
\int_0^\infty \cos\left(zt-\nu \frac{\pi}{2}\right)
t^{\nu}e^{-\frac12 t^2}dt
\,,\; \Re \nu > -1 \;.$$

=== Asymptotic expansion ===
$$D_\nu(z) = e^{-\frac14 z^2}z^{\nu}\left(1
- \frac{\nu (\nu -1)}{2}\frac{1}{z^2}
+ \frac{\nu (\nu -1)(\nu -2)(\nu -3)}{8}\frac{1}{z^4}
- \dots\right)\,,\; \Re z \to +\infty .$$
If $\nu$ is a non-negative integer this series terminates and turns into a polynomial, namely the Hermite polynomial,
$$D_n(z) = e^{-\frac14 z^2}\;2^{-n/2}H_n\left(\frac{z}{\sqrt{2}}\right)\,, n=0,1,2,\dots \;.$$

=== Connection with quantum harmonic oscillator ===
Parabolic cylinder $D_\nu(z)$ function appears naturally in the Schrödinger equation for the one-dimensional quantum harmonic oscillator (a quantum particle in the oscillator potential),
$$\left[-\frac{\hbar^2}{2m}\frac{\partial^2}{\partial x^2}+\frac12 m \omega^2 x^2 \right]\psi(x)
=E\psi(x) \;,$$
where $\hbar$ is the reduced Planck constant, $m$ is the mass of the particle, $x$ is the coordinate of the particle, $\omega$ is the frequency of the oscillator, $E$ is the energy, and $\psi(x)$ is the particle's wave-function. Indeed introducing the new quantities
$$z=\frac{x}{b_o} \,,\; \nu=\frac{E}{\hbar\omega}-\frac12 \,,\; b_o=\sqrt{\frac{\hbar}{2m\omega}} \,,$$
turns the above equation into the Weber's equation for the function $u(z)=\psi(zb_o)$,
$$u''+\left(\nu+\frac12-\frac{1}{4} z^2 \right)u=0 \,.$$
