= Paul Émile Appell =

French mathematician (1855–1930)

Paul Appell
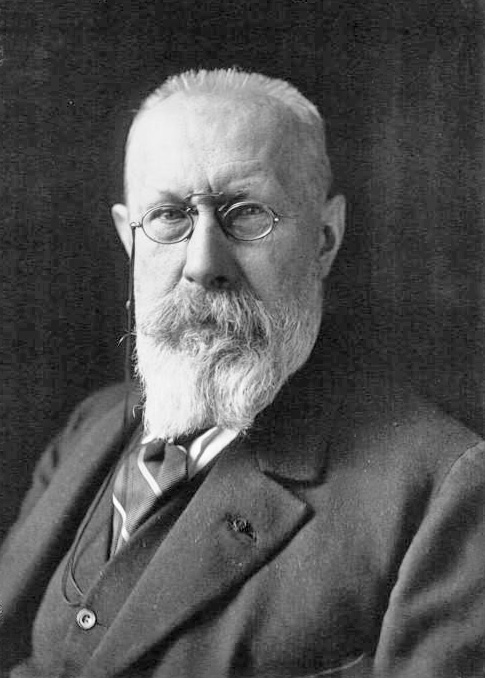
- Appell in 1921
- Born: 27 September 1855; Strasbourg, France
- Died: 24 October 1930 (aged 75); Paris, France
- Known for: Appell polynomials Appell series Appell sequence Appell's equation of motion Appell–Humbert theorem Appell–Lerch sums Complex–shift method
- Scientific career
- Fields: Mathematics; Physics
- Thesis: Sur les propriétés des cubiques gauches et le mouvement hélicoïdal d'un corps solide (1876)

M. P. Appell is the same person: it stands for Monsieur Paul Appell.

Paul Émile Appell (27 September 1855 in Strasbourg – 24 October 1930 in Paris) was a French mathematician and Rector of the University of Paris. Appell polynomials and Appell's equations of motion are named after him, as is rue Paul Appell in the 14th arrondissement of Paris and the minor planet 988 Appella.

== Life ==
Paul Appell entered the École Normale Supérieure in 1873. He was elected to the French Academy of Sciences in 1892.

In 1895, he became a Professor at the École Centrale Paris. Between 1903 and 1920 he was Dean of the Faculty of Science of the University of Paris, then Rector of the University of Paris from 1920 to 1925.

Appell was the President of the Société astronomique de France (SAF), the French astronomical society, from 1919 to 1921.

His daughter Marguerite Appell (1883–1969), who married the mathematician Émile Borel, is known as a novelist under her pen-name Camille Marbo.

Appell was an atheist. He was awarded Order of the White Eagle. and was also elected to honorary membership of the Manchester Literary and Philosophical Society.

== Work ==
He worked first on projective geometry in the line of Chasles, then on algebraic functions, differential equations, and complex analysis. Appell was the editor of the collected works of Henri Poincaré. Jules Drach was co-editor of the first volume.

=== Appell series ===
He introduced a set of four hypergeometric series F_{1}, F_{2}, F_{3}, F_{4} of two variables, now called Appell series, that generalize Gauss's hypergeometric series.

He established the set of partial differential equations of which these functions are solutions, and found formulas and expressions of these series in terms of hypergeometric series of one variable. In 1926, with Professor Joseph-Marie Kampé de Fériet, he authored a treatise on generalized hypergeometric series.

=== Mechanics ===
In mechanics, he proposed an alternative formulation of analytical mechanics known as Appell's equation of motion.

He discovered a physical interpretation of the imaginary period of the doubly periodic function whose restriction to real arguments describes the motion of an ideal pendulum.

== Publications ==
- Traité de mécanique rationnelle, 4 Vols. (Gauthier-Villars, 1893–1896)
- Traité de mécanique rationnelle Tome I
- Traité de mécanique rationnelle Tome II
- Traité de mécanique rationnelle Tome III
- Traité de mécanique rationnelle Tome IV Fasc. 1
- Traité de mécanique rationnelle Tome IV Fasc. 2
- Traité de mécanique rationnelle Tome V
- Les mouvements de roulement en dynamique with Jacques Hadamard (C. Hérissey, Évreux, 1899)
- Éléments de la théorie des vecteurs et de la géométrie analytique (Payot, 1921)
- Éléments d'analyse mathématique à l'usage des ingénieurs et des physiciens : cours professé à l'École centrale des arts et manufactures (Gauthier-Villars, 1921)
- Principes de la théorie des fonctions elliptiques et applications with E. Lacour (Gauthier-Villars, 1897)
- Le problème géométrique des déblais et remblais (Gauthier-Villars, 1928)
- , autobiographic (Payot, 1923)
- Théorie des fonctions algébriques et de leurs intégrales with Édouard Goursat.
- Fonctions hypergéométriques et hypersphériques with Joseph-Marie Kampé de Fériet (Gauthier-Villars, 1926)
- See catalogue of the French National Library for a more detailed list

== See also ==
- Abelian integral
- Generalized Appell polynomials
