= Joseph Kampé de Fériet =

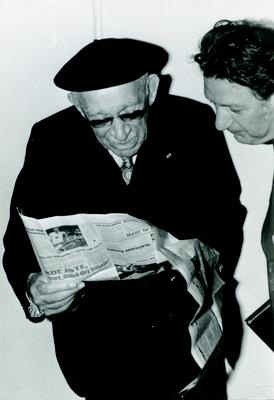
Joseph Kampé de Fériet

Marie-Joseph Kampé de Fériet (14 May 1893 – 6 April 1982) was a French mathematician at Université Lille Nord de France from 1919 to 1969. Besides his works on mathematics and fluid mechanics, he directed the Institut de mécanique des fluides de Lille (ONERA Lille) and taught fluid dynamics and information theory at École centrale de Lille from 1930 to 1969.

He devised the Kampé de Fériet functions, which further generalize the generalized hypergeometric functions.

He was an Invited Speaker of the ICM in 1928 at Bologna, in 1932 at Zurich, and in 1954 at Amsterdam.

== Works ==
- J. Kampé de Fériet & P.E. Appell Fonctions hypergéometriques et hypersphériques (Paris, Gauthier-Villars, 1926)
- J. Kampé de Fériet La fonction hypergéometrique (Paris, Gauthier-Villars, 1937)
