= Turán's inequalities =

Theorems about certain polynomial families

In mathematics, Turán's inequalities are some inequalities for Legendre polynomials found by Pál Turán (and first published by Szegö (1948)). There are many generalizations to other polynomials, often called Turán's inequalities, given by (E. F. Beckenbach, W. Seidel & Otto Szász 1951) and other authors.

If $P_n$ is the $n$th Legendre polynomial, Turán's inequalities state that

$$\,\! P_n(x)^2 > P_{n-1}(x)P_{n+1}(x)\ \text{for}\ -1<x<1.$$

For $H_n$, the $n$th Hermite polynomial, Turán's inequalities are

$$H_n(x)^2 - H_{n-1}(x)H_{n+1}(x)= (n-1)!\cdot \sum_{i=0}^{n-1}\frac{2^{n-i}}{i!}H_i(x)^2>0 ,$$

whilst for Chebyshev polynomials they are

$$T_n(x)^2 - T_{n-1}(x)T_{n+1}(x)= 1-x^2>0 \ \text{for}\ -1<x<1 .$$

== See also ==
- Askey–Gasper inequality
- Sturm's theorem
