= Hermite transform =

In mathematics, the Hermite transform is an integral transform named after the mathematician Charles Hermite that uses Hermite polynomials $H_n(x)$ as kernels of the transform.

The Hermite transform $H\{F(x)\} \equiv f_H (n)$ of a function $F(x)$ is
$$H\{F(x)\} \equiv f_H(n) = \int_{-\infty}^\infty e^{-x^2} \ H_n(x)\  F(x) \ dx$$

The inverse Hermite transform $H^{-1}\{f_H(n)\}$ is given by
$$H^{-1}\{f_H(n)\} \equiv F(x) = \sum_{n=0}^\infty \frac{1}{\sqrt\pi 2^n n!} f_H(n) H_n(x)$$

== Computational complexity ==
Direct evaluation of a discrete Hermite transform with $N$ coefficients and $O(N)$ sample points requires $O(N^2)$ arithmetic operations. Leibon, Rockmore, Park, Taintor, and Chirikjian developed fast algorithms for the forward and inverse transforms requiring $O(N\log^2 N)$ operations, exploiting the three-term recurrence satisfied by the Hermite polynomials.

Jain, Iyer, Somma, Bao, and Jordan developed a quantum algorithm that implements an approximate discrete Hermite transform using a number of quantum gates polynomial in $\log N$ and $\log(1/\varepsilon)$, where $N$ is the number of Hermite modes and $\varepsilon$ is the approximation error. The algorithm uses fast-forwarding of the quantum harmonic oscillator. It transforms information encoded in the amplitudes of a quantum state, rather than producing an explicit classical list of transform coefficients; the gate bound does not include preparing an arbitrary input state from classical data.

== Some Hermite transform pairs ==
$F(x)\,$	$f_H(n)\,$
$x^m$	$$\begin{cases} \frac{m!\sqrt{\pi} }{2^{m-n} \left(\frac{m-n}{2}\right)!}, & (m-n)\text{ even and} \geq0 \\ 0, & \text{otherwise} \end{cases}$$
$e^{ax}\,$	$\sqrt\pi a^n e^{a^2/4}\,$
$e^{2xt-t^2}, \ |t|<\frac{1}{2}\,$	$\sqrt\pi (2t)^n$
$H_m(x)\,$	$\sqrt\pi 2^n n!\delta_{nm}\,$
$x^2H_m(x)\,$	$$2^n n! \sqrt{\pi}\begin{cases} 1 , & n=m+2 \\ \left(n+\frac{1}{2}\right), & n=m \\ (n+1)(n+2),& n=m-2 \\ 0, & \text{otherwise}\end{cases}$$
$e^{-x^2}H_m(x)\,$	$\left(-1\right)^{p-m} 2^{p-1/2} \Gamma(p+1/2),\ m+n=2p,\ p\in\mathbb{Z}$
$H_m^2(x)\,$	$$\begin{cases} 2^{m+n/2}\sqrt\pi \binom m{n/2}\frac{m!n!}{(n/2)!}, & n\text{ even and}\leq 2m \\ 0, & \text{otherwise} \end{cases}$$
$H_m(x)H_p(x)\,$	$$\begin{cases} \frac{2^k\sqrt\pi m!n!p!}{(k-m)!(k-n)!(k-p)!} , &  n+m+p=2k,\ k\in\mathbb{Z};\ |m-p|\leq n\leq m+p\\ 0 ,              &  \text{otherwise} \end{cases}\,$$
$H_{n+p+q}(x)H_p(x)H_q(x)\,$	$\sqrt\pi 2^{n+p+q} (n+p+q)!\,$
$\frac{d^m}{dx^m}F(x)\,$	$f_H(n+m)\,$
$x\frac{d^m}{dx^m}F(x)\,$	$nf_H(n+m-1)+\frac{1}{2}f_H(n+m+1)\,$
$e^{x^2}\frac{d}{dx}\left[e^{-x^2}\frac{d}{dx}F(x)\right]\,$	$-2nf_H(n)\,$
$F(x - x_0)$	$\sqrt{\pi}\sum^\infty_{k=0}\frac{(-x_0)^k}{k!}f_H(n+k)$
$F(x)*G(x)\,$	$\sqrt\pi(-1)^n\left[2^{2n+1}\Gamma \left(n+\frac{3}{2}\right)\right]^{-1}f_H(n) g_H(n)\,$
$e^{z^2} \sin(x z), \ |z|<\frac 12\ \,$	$$\begin{cases} \sqrt\pi (-1)^{\lfloor\frac{n}{2}\rfloor}(2z)^{n} , &  n\,\mathrm{odd}\\ 0 ,              &  n\,\mathrm{even} \end{cases}\,$$
$(1-z^2)^{-1/2} \exp\left[\frac{2xyz-(x^2+y^2)z^2}{(1-z^2)}\right]\,$	$\sqrt\pi z^n H_n(y)$
$\frac{H_m(y)H_{m+1}(x)-H_m(x)H_{m+1}(y)}{2^{m+1}m!(x-y)}$	$$\begin{cases}\sqrt{\pi}H_n(y) & n \leq m\\ 0 & n > m \end{cases}$$

== Sources ==
- Erdélyi, Arthur; Magnus, Wilhelm; Oberhettinger, Fritz [in German]; Tricomi, Francesco G. (1955), Higher transcendental functions (PDF), vol. II, McGraw-Hill, ISBN 978-0-07-019546-2, archived from the original (PDF) on 2011-07-14
