= Gegenbauer =

Gegenbauer is a German surname. Notable people with the surname include:

- Josef Anton Gegenbauer (1800–1876), German historical and portrait painter
- Leopold Gegenbauer (1849–1903), Austrian mathematician

== See also ==
- Carl Gegenbaur (1826–1903), German anatomist and professor
- Gegenbauer polynomials, in mathematics
