= Erlaa =

Erlaa may refer to:

- Erlaa (Vienna), a cadastral commune of Vienna
- a cadastral commune of Asperhofen
- the Latvian municipality Ērgļi
