= William Granville =

William Granville may refer to:

- William Anthony Granville (1864–1943), mathematician
- William Granville, 3rd Earl of Bath
- William Leveson-Gower, 4th Earl Granville (1880–1953), British sailor and governor
- William Granville (civil servant) (1785–1864), Treasurer of Ceylon
