= James Pierpont =

James Pierpont may refer to:

- James Pierpont (minister) (1659–1714), US Congregationalist minister and founder of Yale University
- James Pierpont (mathematician) (1866–1938), American mathematician
- James Lord Pierpont (1822–1893), American songwriter and composer
