= Leopold Gegenbauer =

Austrian mathematician (1849–1903)

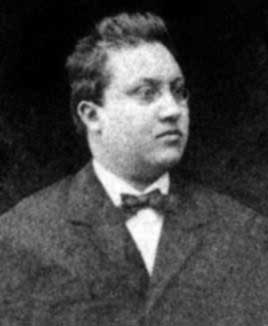
Leopold Gegenbauer

Leopold Bernhard Gegenbauer (2 February 1849, Asperhofen – 3 June 1903, Gießhübl) was an Austrian mathematician remembered best as an algebraist. Gegenbauer polynomials are named after him.

Leopold Gegenbauer was the son of a doctor. He studied at the University of Vienna from 1869 until 1873. He then went to Berlin where he studied from 1873 to 1875 working under Weierstrass and Kronecker.

After graduating from Berlin, Gegenbauer was appointed to the position of extraordinary professor at the University of Czernowitz (modern Chernivtsi, Ukraine) in 1875, at that time in the Austrian Empire. Czernowitz University was founded in 1875 and Gegenbauer was the first professor of mathematics there. He remained in Czernowitz for three years before moving to the University of Innsbruck where he worked with Otto Stolz. Again he held the position of extraordinary professor in Innsbruck.

After three years teaching in Innsbruck, Gegenbauer was appointed full professor in 1881. He was then appointed full professor at the University of Vienna in 1893. During the session of 1897–1898, he was Dean of the university. He remained at Vienna until his death. Among the students who studied with him at Vienna were the Slovenian Josip Plemelj, the American James Pierpont, Ernst Fischer, and Lothar von Rechtenstamm.

Gegenbauer had many mathematical interests such as number theory, complex analysis, and the theory of integration, but he was chiefly an algebraist. He is remembered for the Gegenbauer polynomials, a class of orthogonal polynomials. They are obtained from the hypergeometric series in certain cases where the series is in fact finite. The Gegenbauer polynomials are solutions to the Gegenbauer differential equation and are generalizations of the associated Legendre polynomials.

Gegenbauer also gave his name to arithmetic functions studied in analytic number theory. The Gegenbauer functions Ρ and ρ (upper case and lower case rho) are defined as follows.

$$P_{a,r}(n):=\sum_{d\,\mid\,n; d^{1/r}\in\mathbb N}d^a=:n^a\rho_{-a,r}(n)$$

In 1973 in Vienna in the district of Floridsdorf (21. Bezirk) a street was named in his honor the Gegenbauerweg.

== Selected works ==
- Einige Sätze über Determinanten hohen Ranges, 1890
- Über den größten gemeinsamen Theiler, 1892
