= William Anthony Granville =

American mathematician (1863–1943)

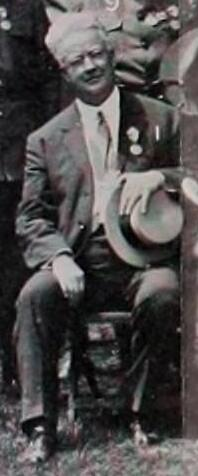
- Granville in 1914
- Born: December 16, 1863; White Rock, Minnesota, U.S.
- Died: February 4, 1943 (aged 79); Chicago, Illinois, U.S.
- Education: Gustavus Adolphus College; Yale College (PhD); Lafayette College (LLD); Muhlenberg College
- Occupation: Educator
- Spouse: Ida Irvin
- Children: 2

William Anthony Granville (December 16, 1863 – February 4, 1943) was an American mathematician, and served as president of Gettysburg College from 1910 until 1923.

== Early life ==
William Anthony Granville was born on December 16, 1863, in White Rock, Minnesota, to Hannah (née Olson) and T. Pearson Granville. He was of Swedish heritage. He attended Gustavus Adolphus College and the Sheffield Scientific School at Yale College. In 1893 he was awarded a bachelor's degree in mathematics from Yale. In 1897, he graduated from Yale with a Doctor of Philosophy. He studied under James Pierpont and his dissertation was titled, "Referat on the Origin and Development of the Addition-Theorem in Elliptic Functions". He later graduated from Lafayette College with a Doctor of Laws in 1911. He also attended Muhlenberg College.

== Career ==
Granville began his teaching career at Bethany College, where he was an instructor of mathematics and served as the college treasurer. He was acting president of Bethany College. He was professor of mathematics at Yale from 1895 to 1910. He then served as president of Gettysburg College from October 1910 to 1923. During his tenure as president, he is credited with removing the school's existing debt and establishing an endowment fund. The faculty numbers were increased and the Student Christian association building, the academy building (later Huber Hall) and Weidensall Hall were erected. The department of engineering was established, which remained until 1939. The summer school was established and the entrance requirements of students was raised. During World War I at the college, he organized a department of military science and tactics and established ROTC at the school. He was also president of the American Federation of Lutheran Brotherhoods from 1925 to 1929. He wrote textbooks on differential and integral calculus, plane and spherical trigonometry and mathematical analysis. He was a member of the American Mathematical Society, Sigma Chi and the American Society of Swedish Engineers.

In 1918, Granville was a member of the executive committee of the Churches of Christ. He became affiliated with the Washington National Insurance Company of Evanston, Illinois, on March 1, 1923. He became vice president and director and served in those roles until his death. He also wrote accident and health insurance manuals.

== Personal life ==
Granville married Ida Irwin of McPherson, Kansas. They had two daughters, Rachel and Mrs. S. F. Lehman.

Granville died of a heart attack on February 4, 1943, at his home in Chicago.

== Works ==
- W. A. Granville (1909). Percey F. Smith (ed.). Plane Trigonometry and Tables. Ginn & Co.
- W. A. Granville (1911) [1904]. Percey F. Smith (ed.). Elements of the Differential and Integral Calculus. Ginn & Co. pp. 463.
- W. A. Granville (1909). Plane and Spherical Trigonometry, and Four-place Tables of Logarithms. New York: Ginn & Co.
- Percey F. Smith, W. A. Granville (1910). Elementary Analysis. Boston, New York: Ginn & Co. p. 223.
- W. A. Granville (1922). The Fourth Dimension and the Bible. Boston: R. G. Badger. pp. 119.
