= Bochner's theorem (orthogonal polynomials) =

Characterization theorem found in 1929

In the theory of orthogonal polynomials, Bochner's theorem is a characterization theorem of certain families of orthogonal polynomials as polynomial solutions to Sturm–Liouville problems with polynomial coefficients.

The theorem is named after Salomon Bochner, who discovered it in 1929.

== Setup ==
Define notations

- $D_x$ is the differential operator.
- $T_1, T_2, \dots$ are linear operators on functions. For example, $g(x) \mapsto f(x) D_x g(x)$ is one. They are often assumed to be polynomials in $x, D_x$.
- $f_1, f_2, \dots$ are real or complex functions, and are often assumed to be polynomials.
- $\lambda_i$ are real or complex numbers. They are eigenvalues of linear operators.
- $a, b, \alpha, \beta$ are real or complex numbers. They parameterize the solution families.

A Sturm–Liouville problem is specified as follows: Given functions $f_2, f_1, f_0$ and operators $T_2, T_1$, solve for $\lambda_n, y_n$ in
$$[f_2 T_2 + f_1 T_1 + f_0] y_n = \lambda_n y_n$$
Equivalently, it is solving for the eigenpairs of the operator $f_2 T_2 + f_1 T_1 + f_0$.

== Statement ==
Let $T_2 = D_x^2, T_1 = D_x$. Bochner's problem asks the following: consider the SL problem
$$[f_2 D_x^2 + f_1 D_x + f_0] y_n = \lambda_n y_n$$
For what values of $f_0, f_1, f_2$, are the eigenpairs $(\lambda_0, y_0), (\lambda_1, y_1), \dots$ such that $y_0$ is a polynomial of degree 0, $y_1$ is a polynomial of degree 1, etc?

Observe first that by plugging in the $y_0 = 1$ solution, we have $f_0(x) = \lambda_0$, so we may WLOG assume that $\lambda_0 = 0, f_0 = 0$. Similarly, by plugging in the $y_1 = x + a, \; y_2 = x^2 + ax + b$, we find that $f_1, f_2$ must be polynomials of degree at most 1, 2 respectively.

Bochner's theorem states that, up to a complex-affine transform of $x$ (that is, of form $x \mapsto ax + b$), there are only 5 families of solutions:

5 polynomial families
| Polynomial solution $y_n(x)$ | $f_2(x)$ | $f_1(x)$ | $\lambda_n$ | Condition |
|---|---|---|---|---|
| Jacobi polynomials $P_n^{(\alpha, \beta)}(x)$ | $1-x^2$ | $\beta-\alpha-x(\alpha+\beta+2)$ | $-n(n+\alpha+\beta+1)$ | $\alpha, \beta, \alpha+\beta + 1 \not\in\{-1, -2, \dots\}$ |
| Laguerre polynomials $L_n^{(\alpha)}(x)$ | $x$ | $1+\alpha-x$ | $-n$ | $\alpha \not\in\{-1, -2, \dots\}$ |
| Hermite polynomials $H_n(x)$ | $1$ | $-2x$ | $-2n$ | |
| Bessel polynomials $y_n(x; a, 1)$ | $x^2$ | $ax+1$ | $n(n+a-1)$ | $a \not\in\{0, -1, -2, \dots\}$ |
| Monomials $x^n$ | $x^2$ | $x$ | $n^2$ | |

Proof sketch: By the previous observation, there are only 5 parameters in total that characterize the problem:
$$(ax^2 + bx + c)y'' + (dx + e) y' = \lambda y$$
Setting $a = 1$, then up to a complex affine transform, it reduces to the form
$$(1-x^2)y'' + (dx + e) y' = \lambda y$$
This is the form of the Jacobi differential equation, and has polynomial solutions precisely when there exists $\alpha, \beta$ such that $dx + e = \beta-\alpha-x(\alpha+\beta+2)$. These are the Jacobi polynomials. The other cases are, up to affine scaling, the various limits of the $a = 1$ case. The solution families are then obtained by taking the respective limits of the Jacobi polynomials. The conditions on the parameters are necessary to prevent the leading coefficient from going zero.

The original proof by Bochner directly considered the 3 possible cases:

- $a = 1$
- $a = 0, b = 1$
- $a = b = 0, c = 1$

and for each, performed a complex-affine transform of the variable and solved the corresponding equation.

== Extensions ==
The Bochner's theorem allows many extensions, by relaxing various conditions on the setup of Bochner's problem. Other extensions are reviewed in and.

=== Real case ===
If instead of complex-affine transforms, we only permit real-affine transforms, then there are 2 more families: twisted Hermite, and twisted Jacobi:

2 extra polynomial families
| Polynomial solution $y_n(x)$ | $f_2(x)$ | $f_1(x)$ | $\lambda_n$ | Condition |
|---|---|---|---|---|
| twisted Jacobi polynomials $\check{P}_n^{(\alpha, \beta)}(x)$ | $1+x^2$ | $i(\beta-\alpha)-x(\alpha+\beta+2)$ | $n(n+\alpha+\beta+1)$ | $\alpha+\beta + 1 \not\in\{-1, -2, \dots\}$ |
| twisted Hermite polynomials $\check{H}_n(x)$ | $1$ | $2x$ | $2n$ | |

The 2 extra cases are orthogonal, but not positive-definite. The twisted Hermite satisfies the following complex-orthogonality:
$$\int_{-i \infty}^{i \infty} \check{H}_m(x) \check{H}_n(x) \exp \left(x^2\right) d x=(-1)^n \sqrt{\pi} n!2^{-n} i \delta_{m n} \quad(m \text { and } n \geq 0)$$
They are orthogonal (but not positive-definite) with respect to the real weight function
$$w(x)= \begin{cases}0 & \text { if } x \leq 0 \\ e^{x^2} \int_0^x e^{-t^2} g(t) d t & \text { if } x>0\end{cases}$$
where $g$ is any real function supported on $[0, \infty)$, that satisfies $\int_0^{\infty} e^{-x^2} g(x) d x=0$, and has all moments zero.

The twisted Jacobi satisfies the following complex-orthogonality:
$$\begin{aligned}
&\begin{aligned}
& \left\langle(1-x)_{+}^\alpha(1+x)_{+}^\beta, \check{P}_m^{(\alpha, \beta)}(i x) \check{P}_n^{(\alpha, \beta)}(i x)\right\rangle \\
& =\frac{(-1)^n 2^{2 n+\alpha+\beta+1} \Gamma(n+\alpha+1) \Gamma(n+\beta+1) \Gamma(n+\alpha+\beta+1) n!}{\Gamma(2 n+\alpha+\beta+1) \Gamma(2 n+\alpha+\beta+2)} \delta_{m n}
\end{aligned}\\
&(m \text { and } n \geq 0)
\end{aligned}$$
where the average is taken over the function $\left(1+x^2\right)^{\frac{2-d}{2}} e^{i(\beta - \alpha) \arctan x}$.

They are orthogonal (but not positive-definite) with respect to the real weight function
$$w(x)=e^{f(x)}\left[c+\int_0^x e^{-f(t)}\left(1+t^2\right)^{-1} g(t) d t\right]$$
where $g$ is any real function supported on $[0, \infty)$, that satisfies $\int_0^{\infty} e^{-f(t)}\left(1+t^2\right)^{-1} g(t) d t=0$, and has all moments zero.

=== Exceptional ===
The original Bochner's theorem assumes that there exists one polynomial solution per degree. If we relax this assumption, then we obtain the exceptional polynomial families. In an exception polynomial family, some degrees may not correspond to any polynomial. Such a family does not make up a complete basis for the function space, because certain polynomial functions cannot be expressed as a linear combination of its elements, but such a family may still have certain applications.
