= Gegenbauer polynomials =

Polynomial sequence

In mathematics, Gegenbauer polynomials or ultraspherical polynomials C^{(α)}_{n}(x) are orthogonal polynomials on the interval [−1,1] with respect to the weight function (1 − x^{2})^{α–1/2}. They generalize Legendre polynomials and Chebyshev polynomials, and are special cases of Jacobi polynomials. They are named after Leopold Gegenbauer.

== Characterizations ==
Plot of the Gegenbauer polynomial C n^(m)(x) with n=10 and m=1 in the complex plane from -2-2i to 2+2i with colors created with Mathematica 13.1 function ComplexPlot3D

Gegenbauer polynomials with α=1

Gegenbauer polynomials with α=2

Gegenbauer polynomials with α=3

An animation showing the polynomials on the xα-plane for the first 4 values of n.

A variety of characterizations of the Gegenbauer polynomials are available.

- The polynomials can be defined in terms of their generating function:

$$\frac{1}{(1-2xt+t^2)^\alpha}=\sum_{n=0}^\infty C_n^{(\alpha)}(x) t^n \qquad (0 \leq |x| < 1, |t| \leq 1, \alpha > 0)$$

- The polynomials satisfy the recurrence relation:

$$\begin{align}
C_0^{(\alpha)}(x) & = 1 \\
C_1^{(\alpha)}(x) & = 2 \alpha x \\
(n+1) C_{n+1}^{(\alpha)}(x) & = 2(n+\alpha) x C_{n}^{(\alpha)}(x) - (n+2\alpha-1)C_{n-1}^{(\alpha)}(x).
\end{align}$$

- Gegenbauer polynomials are particular solutions of the Gegenbauer differential equation:

$$(1-x^{2})y''-(2\alpha+1)xy'+n(n+2\alpha)y=0.\,$$

When α = 1/2, the equation reduces to the Legendre equation, and the Gegenbauer polynomials reduce to the Legendre polynomials.
When α = 1, the equation reduces to the Chebyshev differential equation, and the Gegenbauer polynomials reduce to the Chebyshev polynomials of the second kind.

- They are given as Gaussian hypergeometric series in certain cases where the series is in fact finite:

$$C_n^{(\alpha)}(z)=\frac{(2\alpha)_n}{n!}
\,_2F_1\left(-n,2\alpha+n;\alpha+\frac{1}{2};\frac{1-z}{2}\right).$$

Here (2α)_{n} is the rising factorial. Explicitly,

$$C_n^{(\alpha)}(z)=\sum_{k=0}^{\lfloor n/2\rfloor} (-1)^k\frac{\Gamma(n-k+\alpha)}{\Gamma(\alpha)k!(n-2k)!}(2z)^{n-2k}.$$

From this it is also easy to obtain the value at unit argument:

$$C_n^{(\alpha)}(1)=\frac{\Gamma(2\alpha+n)}{\Gamma(2\alpha)n!}.$$

- They are special cases of the Jacobi polynomials:

$$C_n^{(\alpha)}(x) = \frac{(2\alpha)_n}{(\alpha+\frac{1}{2})_{n}}P_n^{(\alpha-1/2,\alpha-1/2)}(x).$$

in which $(\theta)_n$ represents the rising factorial of $\theta$.
One therefore also has the Rodrigues formula

$$C_n^{(\alpha)}(x) = \frac{(-1)^n}{2^n n!}\frac{\Gamma(\alpha+\frac{1}{2})\Gamma(n+2\alpha)}{\Gamma(2\alpha)\Gamma(\alpha+n+\frac{1}{2})}(1-x^2)^{-\alpha+1/2}\frac{d^n}{dx^n}\left[(1-x^2)^{n+\alpha-1/2}\right].$$

- An alternative normalization sets $C_n^{(\alpha)}(1)=1$. Assuming this alternative normalization, the derivatives of Gegenbauer are expressed in terms of Gegenbauer:

$$\begin{aligned}
\frac{d^q}{dx^q}C_{q+2 j+1}^{(\alpha)}(x)=\frac{2^q(q+2 j+1)!}{(q-1)!\Gamma(q+2 j+2 \alpha+1)} & \sum_{i=0}^j \frac{(2 i+\alpha+1) \Gamma(2 i+2 \alpha+1)}{(2 i+1)!(j-i)!} \\
& \times \frac{\Gamma(q+j+i+\alpha+1)}{\Gamma(j+i+\alpha+2)}(q+j-i-1)!C_{2 i+1}^{(\alpha)}(x)
\end{aligned}$$

== Orthogonality and normalization ==
For a fixed α > -1/2, the polynomials are orthogonal on [−1, 1] with respect to the weighting function

$$w(z) = \left(1-z^2\right)^{\alpha-\frac{1}{2}}.$$

To wit, for n ≠ m,

$$\int_{-1}^1 C_n^{(\alpha)}(x)C_m^{(\alpha)}(x)(1-x^2)^{\alpha-\frac{1}{2}}\,dx = 0.$$

They are normalized by

$$\int_{-1}^1 \left[C_n^{(\alpha)}(x)\right]^2(1-x^2)^{\alpha-\frac{1}{2}}\,dx = \frac{\pi 2^{1-2\alpha}\Gamma(n+2\alpha)}{n!(n+\alpha)[\Gamma(\alpha)]^2}.$$

== Applications ==
The Gegenbauer polynomials appear naturally as extensions of Legendre polynomials in the context of potential theory and harmonic analysis. The Newtonian potential in R^{n} has the expansion, valid with α = (n − 2)/2,

$$\frac{1}{|\mathbf{x}-\mathbf{y}|^{n-2}} = \sum_{k=0}^\infty \frac{|\mathbf{x}|^k}{|\mathbf{y}|^{k+n-2}}C_k^{(\alpha)}(\frac{\mathbf{x}\cdot \mathbf{y}}{|\mathbf{x}||\mathbf{y}|}).$$

When n = 3, this gives the Legendre polynomial expansion of the gravitational potential. Similar expressions are available for the expansion of the Poisson kernel in a ball.

It follows that the quantities $C^{((n-2)/2)}_k(\mathbf{x}\cdot\mathbf{y})$ are spherical harmonics, when regarded as a function of x only. They are, in fact, exactly the zonal spherical harmonics, up to a normalizing constant.

Gegenbauer polynomials also appear in the theory of positive-definite functions.

The Askey–Gasper inequality reads

$$\sum_{j=0}^n\frac{C_j^\alpha(x)}{{2\alpha+j-1\choose j}}\ge 0\qquad (x\ge-1,\, \alpha\ge 1/4).$$

In spectral methods for solving differential equations, if a function is expanded in the basis of Chebyshev polynomials and its derivative is represented in a Gegenbauer/ultraspherical basis, then the derivative operator becomes a diagonal matrix, leading to fast banded matrix methods for large problems.

== Other properties ==
Dirichlet–Mehler-type integral representation:
$$\frac{P^{(\alpha,\alpha)}_{n}\left(\cos\theta\right)}{P^{(\alpha,\alpha)}_{n}\left(1\right)}=\frac{C^{(\alpha+\frac{1}{2})}_{n}\left(\cos\theta\right)}{C^{(\alpha+\frac{1}{2})}_{n}\left(1\right)}=\frac{2^{\alpha+\frac{1}{2}}\Gamma\left(\alpha+1\right)}{{\pi}^{\frac{1}{2}}\Gamma\left(\alpha+\frac{1}{2}\right)}(\sin\theta)^{-2\alpha}\int_{0}^{\theta}\frac{\cos\left((n+\alpha+\tfrac{1}{2})\phi\right)}{(\cos\phi-\cos\theta)^{-\alpha+\frac{1}{2}}}\,\mathrm{d}\phi,$$
Laplace-type integral representation
$$\begin{aligned}
\frac{P_n^{(\alpha, \alpha)}(\cos \theta)}{P_n^{(\alpha, \alpha)}(1)} & =\frac{C_n^{\left(\alpha+\frac{1}{2}\right)}(\cos \theta)}{C_n^{\left(\alpha+\frac{1}{2}\right)}(1)} \\
& =\frac{\Gamma(\alpha+1)}{\pi^{\frac{1}{2}} \Gamma\left(\alpha+\frac{1}{2}\right)} \int_0^\pi(\cos \theta+i \sin \theta \cos \phi)^n(\sin \phi)^{2 \alpha} \mathrm{~d} \phi
\end{aligned}$$
Addition formula:

$$\begin{aligned}
& C_n^\lambda\left(\cos \theta_1 \cos \theta_2+\sin \theta_1 \sin \theta_2 \cos \phi\right) \\
& \quad=\sum_{k=0}^n a_{n, k}^\lambda\left(\sin \theta_1\right)^k C_{n-k}^{\lambda+k}\left(\cos \theta_1\right)\left(\sin \theta_2\right)^k C_{n-k}^{\lambda+k}\left(\cos \theta_2\right) \\
& \quad \cdot C_k^{\lambda-1 / 2}(\cos \phi), \quad a_{n, k}^\lambda \text { constants }
\end{aligned}$$

== Asymptotics ==
Given fixed $\lambda \in (0, 1), M \in \{1, 2, \dots\}, \delta \in (0, \pi/2)$, uniformly for all $\theta\in[\delta,\pi-\delta]$, for $n \to \infty$,
$$C^{(\lambda)}_{n}\left(\cos\theta\right)=
\frac{2^{2\lambda}\Gamma\left(\lambda+\frac{1}{2}\right)}{{\pi}^{\frac{1}{2}}\Gamma\left(\lambda+1\right)}\frac{{\left(2\lambda\right)_{n}}}{{\left(\lambda+1\right)_{n}}}\left(\sum_{m=0}^{M-1}\dfrac{{\left(\lambda\right)_{m}}{\left(1-\lambda\right)_{m}}}{m!\,{\left(n+\lambda+1\right)_{m}}}\dfrac{\cos\theta_{n,m}}{(2\sin\theta)^{m+\lambda}}+R_M(\theta)\right)$$

where $(\cdot)_m$ is the Pochhammer symbol, and
$$\theta_{n,m}=(n+m+\lambda)\theta-\tfrac{1}{2}(m+\lambda)\pi$$
The remainder $R_M = O\left(\frac{1}{n^{M}}\right)$ has an explicit upper bound:
$$|R_M(\theta)| \leq (2 / \pi) \sin (\lambda \pi)
\frac{\Gamma(n+2 \lambda)}{\Gamma(\lambda)} \frac{\Gamma(M+\lambda) \Gamma(M-\lambda+1)}{M!\Gamma(n+M+\lambda+1)} \frac{\max \left(|\cos \theta|^{-1}, 2 \sin \theta\right)}{(2 \sin \theta)^{M+\lambda}}$$
where $\Gamma$ is the Gamma function.

Other asymptotic formulas can be obtained as special cases of asymptotic formulas for the more general Jacobi polynomials.

== See also ==
- Rogers polynomials, the q-analogue of Gegenbauer polynomials
- Chebyshev polynomials
- Romanovski polynomials
