= Percey F. Smith =

American mathematician

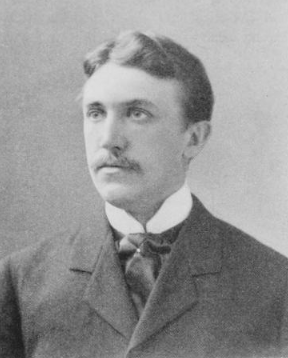
- Born: Percey Franklyn Smith; August 21, 1867; Nyack, New York, US
- Died: June 3, 1956 (aged 88); Hamden, Connecticut, US
- Education: Sheffield Scientific School
- Occupation: Mathematician
- Spouse: Julia C. Lum (m. 1890)

Percey Franklyn Smith (August 21, 1867 – June 3, 1956) was an American mathematician and professor of mathematics at Sheffield Scientific School of Yale University.

Smith was born in Nyack, New York. He studied mathematics at Sheffield Scientific School of Yale College, finishing the regular course in 1888 and receiving the Doctor of Philosophy in 1891. Starting in 1888 he was instructor for mathematics in Yale until 1894, followed by academic studies in Germany and France at the universities of Göttingen, Berlin, Paris. After returning to Yale in 1896 he was assistant professor of mathematics until 1900, then professor until 1936.

He wrote several papers related to Lie sphere geometry, and is the author of several textbooks such as The elements of analytic geometry (1904), New analytic geometry (1912), Theoretical mechanics (1910). (Note: Works by Percey F. Smith at Open Library)

He married Julia C. Lum on December 23, 1890.

He died at his home in Hamden, Connecticut on June 3, 1956.

The title "Percey F. Smith Professor of Mathematics" is still used in Yale. He was a member of the Connecticut Academy of Arts and Sciences.
