= Josef Anton Gegenbauer =

German artist (1800–1876)

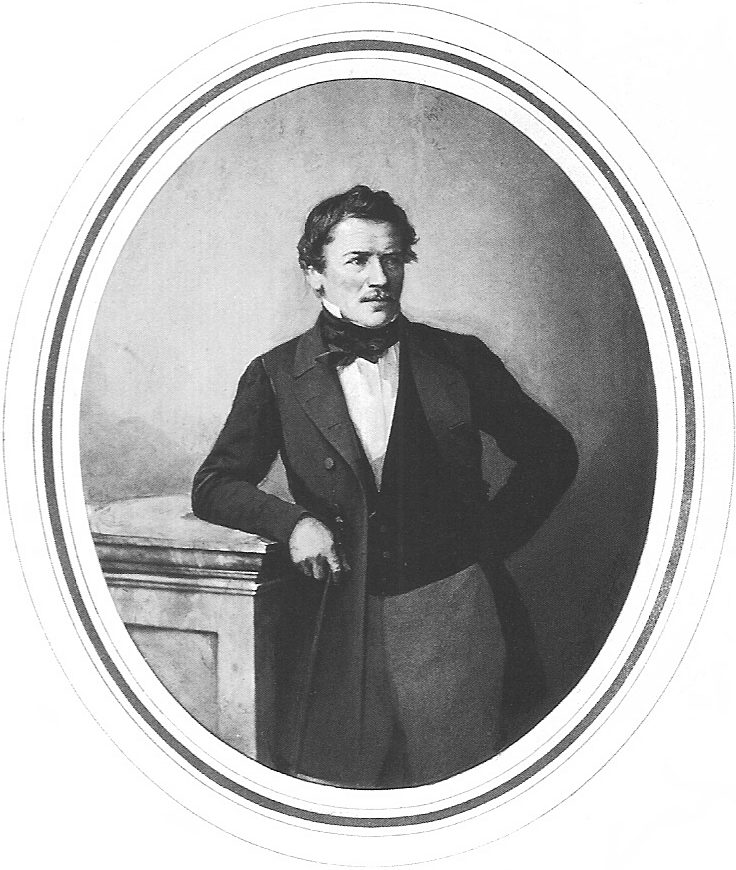
Joseph Anton von Gegenbaur (Photograph by Theodor Widmayer)

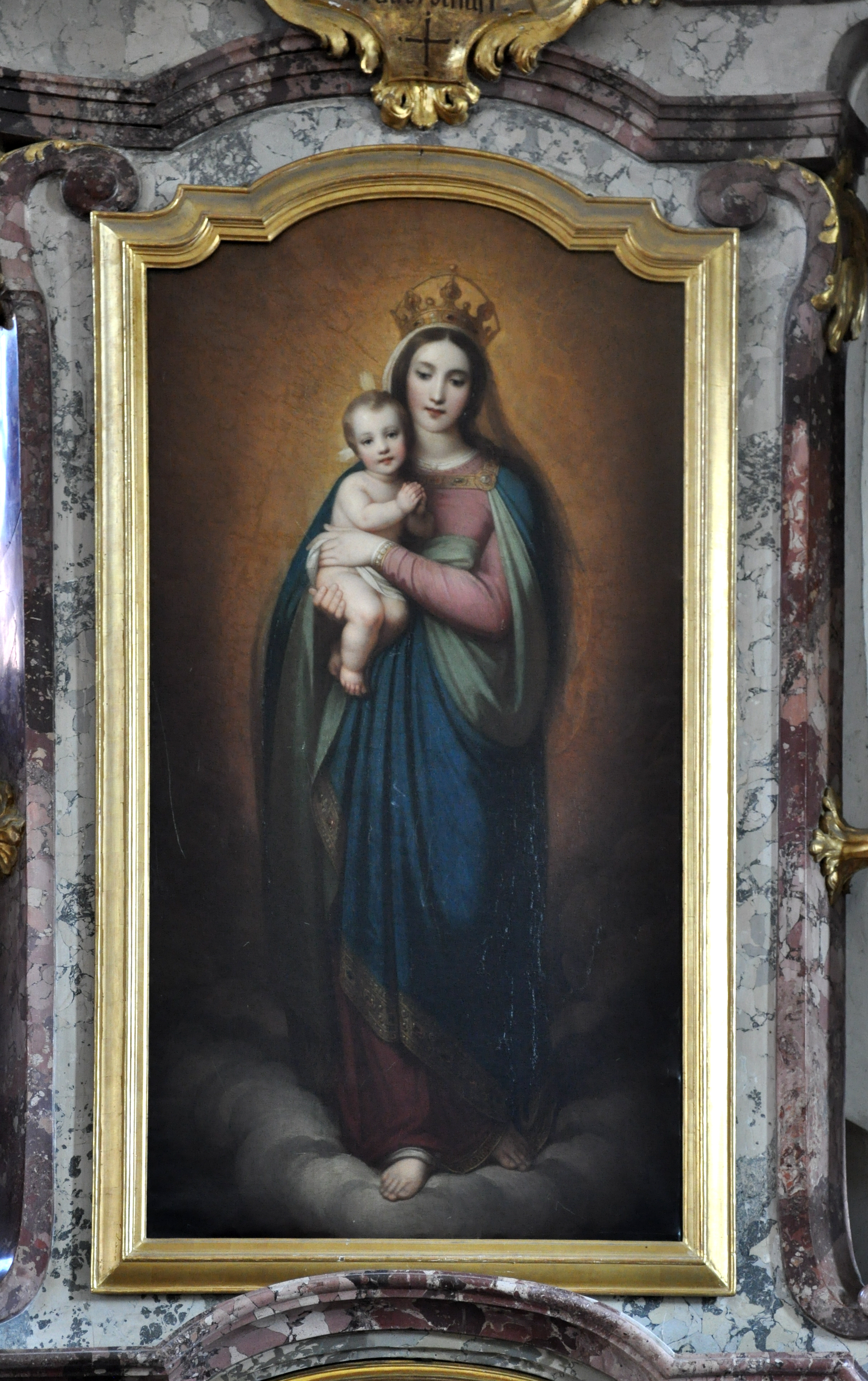
Madonna and Child, St.Martinus Parish Church, Wangen

Josef Anton von Gegenbaur (6 March 1800 – 31 January 1876) was a German historical and portrait painter.

== Biography ==
He was born in Wangen, Württemberg. He studied first at the Royal Academy in Munich under Robert von Langer, remaining in that city from 1815 to 1823. Among his productions there were two idyllic works, a "Saint Sebastian" and a "Madonna and Child", altar-piece for his native town. In 1823 the painter went to Rome, where he remained until 1826, studying especially the works of Raphael. He became successful as a fresco painter, and, on his return to Württemberg, the king made him court painter and commissioned him to decorate the Royal Villa of Schloss Rosenstein. There Gegenbauer painted a number of frescoes:

- "Jupiter giving Immortality to Psyche"
- "The Marriage of Cupid and Psyche",
- four scenes from the life of Psyche
- "The Four Seasons"
- "Aurora"

In 1829 Gegenbaur went again to Rome and worked on frescoes. During later residence in Stuttgart he was employed from 1836 to 1854 in decorating the royal Palace with sixteen scenes in fresco from the history of Württemberg. These include incidents in the life of Count Eberhard II of Württemberg.

Gegenbauer also produced a number of oil paintings, including:

- "Two Shepherds"
- "Adam and Eve after their expulsion from Eden"
- "Moses Striking the Rock"
- "Hercules and Omphale"
- "Sleeping Venus and Two Satyrs"
- "Leda and the Swan"
- "Apollo and the Muses"
- "Bacchus and Ariadne"
- "Venus and Cupid"
- "Ceres and Jason"
- "Aeolus Aeola"
- "Pluto and Proserpine"
- "Neptune and Thetis"
- several Genii and Amorettes
- some portraits
- various Madonnas
- "The Ascension of the Virgin"
- "The Crucifixion"

Gegenbaur died in 1876 in Rome.

== See also ==
- List of German painters
