= James Pierpont (mathematician) =

American mathematician (1866–1938)

- Born: June 16, 1866; Connecticut
- Died: December 9, 1938 (aged 72); San Mateo, California
- Education: Worcester Polytechnic Institute; University of Vienna
- Scientific career
- Fields: mathematics
- Doctoral advisor: Leopold Gegenbauer and Gustav Ritter von Escherich
- Doctoral students: B. H. Camp; W. A. Granville; H. E. Hawkes; H. A. Merrill

James P. Pierpont (June 16, 1866 – December 9, 1938) was an American mathematician born in Connecticut.

== Life ==
James's father Cornelius Pierpont was a wealthy New Haven businessman. He did undergraduate studies at Worcester Polytechnic Institute, initially in mechanical engineering, but turned to mathematics. He went to Europe after graduating in 1886. He studied in Berlin and later in Vienna. He prepared his Ph.D. at the University of Vienna under Leopold Gegenbauer and Gustav Ritter von Escherich. His thesis, defended in 1894, was entitled Zur Geschichte der Gleichung fünften Grades bis zum Jahre 1858. After his defense, he returned to New Haven and was appointed as a lecturer at Yale University, where he would spend most of his career. In 1898, he became professor.

== Research ==
Initially, his research dealt with the Galois theory of equations. The Pierpont primes are named after him, as he introduced them in 1895 in connection with a problem of constructing regular polygons using conic sections. After 1900, he worked in real and complex analysis.

In his textbooks of real analysis, he introduced a definition of the integral analogous to Lebesgue integration. His definition was later criticized by Maurice Fréchet. In the 1920s, he finally turned his interest to non-Euclidean geometry.

== Publications ==
=== Articles ===
- Pierpont, James (1895). "On an undemonstrated theorem of the Disquisitiones Arithmeticæ". Bulletin of the American Mathematical Society. 2 (3): 77–83. doi:10.1090/S0002-9904-1895-00317-1. MR 1557414.
- Pierpont, James (1898). "Early history of Galois' theory of equations". Bull. Amer. Math. Soc. 4 (7): 332–340. doi:10.1090/s0002-9904-1898-00510-4. MR 1557611.
- Pierpont, James (1900). "Mathematical instruction in France". Bull. Amer. Math. Soc. 6 (6): 225–249. doi:10.1090/s0002-9904-1900-00695-1. MR 1557701.
- Pierpont, James (1904). "The history of mathematics in the nineteenth century". Bull. Amer. Math. Soc. 11 (3): 136–159. doi:10.1090/s0002-9904-1904-01198-2. MR 1558180.
- "Some modern views of space (the Gibbs lecture for 1925)". Bull. Amer. Math. Soc. 32 (3): 225–258. 1926. doi:10.1090/s0002-9904-1926-04201-4. MR 1561200.
- Pierpont, James (1928). "Mathematical rigor, past and present". Bull. Amer. Math. Soc. 34 (1): 23–52. doi:10.1090/s0002-9904-1928-04507-x. MR 1561502.
- Pierpont, James (1930). "Non-euclidean geometry, a retrospect". Bull. Amer. Math. Soc. 36 (2): 66–76. doi:10.1090/S0002-9904-1930-04885-5. MR 1561892.

=== Books ===
- 1905: Lectures On The Theory Of Functions Of Real Variables Vol. I, Ginn and Company
- 1912: Lectures On The Theory Of Functions Of Real Variables Vol. II, Ginn and Company
- 1914: Functions of a complex variable, Ginn and Company
