= Chebyshev equation =

Second-order linear differential equation

Chebyshev's equation is the second order linear differential equation

$$(1-x^2) {d^2 y \over d x^2} - x {d y \over d x} + p^2 y = 0,$$

where p is a real (or complex) constant. The equation is named after Russian mathematician Pafnuty Chebyshev. The solutions can be obtained by power series:

$$y = \sum_{n=0}^\infty a_nx^n,$$

where the coefficients obey the recurrence relation

$$a_{n+2} = {(n-p) (n+p) \over (n+1) (n+2) } a_n.$$

The series converges for $|x|<1$ (note, x may be complex), as may be seen by applying the ratio test to the recurrence. The recurrence may be started with arbitrary values of a_{0} and a_{1}, leading to the two-dimensional space of solutions that arises from second-order differential equations. The standard choices are:

a_{0} = 1 ; a_{1} = 0, leading to the solution
$$F(x) = 1 - \frac{p^2}{2!}x^2 + \frac{(p-2)p^2(p+2)}{4!}x^4 - \frac{(p-4)(p-2)p^2(p+2)(p+4)}{6!}x^6 + \cdots$$

and

a_{0} = 0 ; a_{1} = 1, leading to the solution
$$G(x) = x - \frac{(p-1)(p+1)}{3!}x^3 + \frac{(p-3)(p-1)(p+1)(p+3)}{5!}x^5 - \cdots.$$

The general solution is any linear combination of these two.

When p is a non-negative integer, one or the other of the two functions has its series terminate after a finite number of terms: F terminates if p is even, and G terminates if p is odd. In this case, that function is a polynomial of degree p and it is proportional to the Chebyshev polynomial of the first kind

$T_p(x) = (-1)^{p/2}\ F(x)\,$ if p is even
$T_p(x) = (-1)^{(p-1)/2}\ p\ G(x)\,$ if p is odd
