= Asperhofen =

Town in Lower Austria, Austria

- Municipality
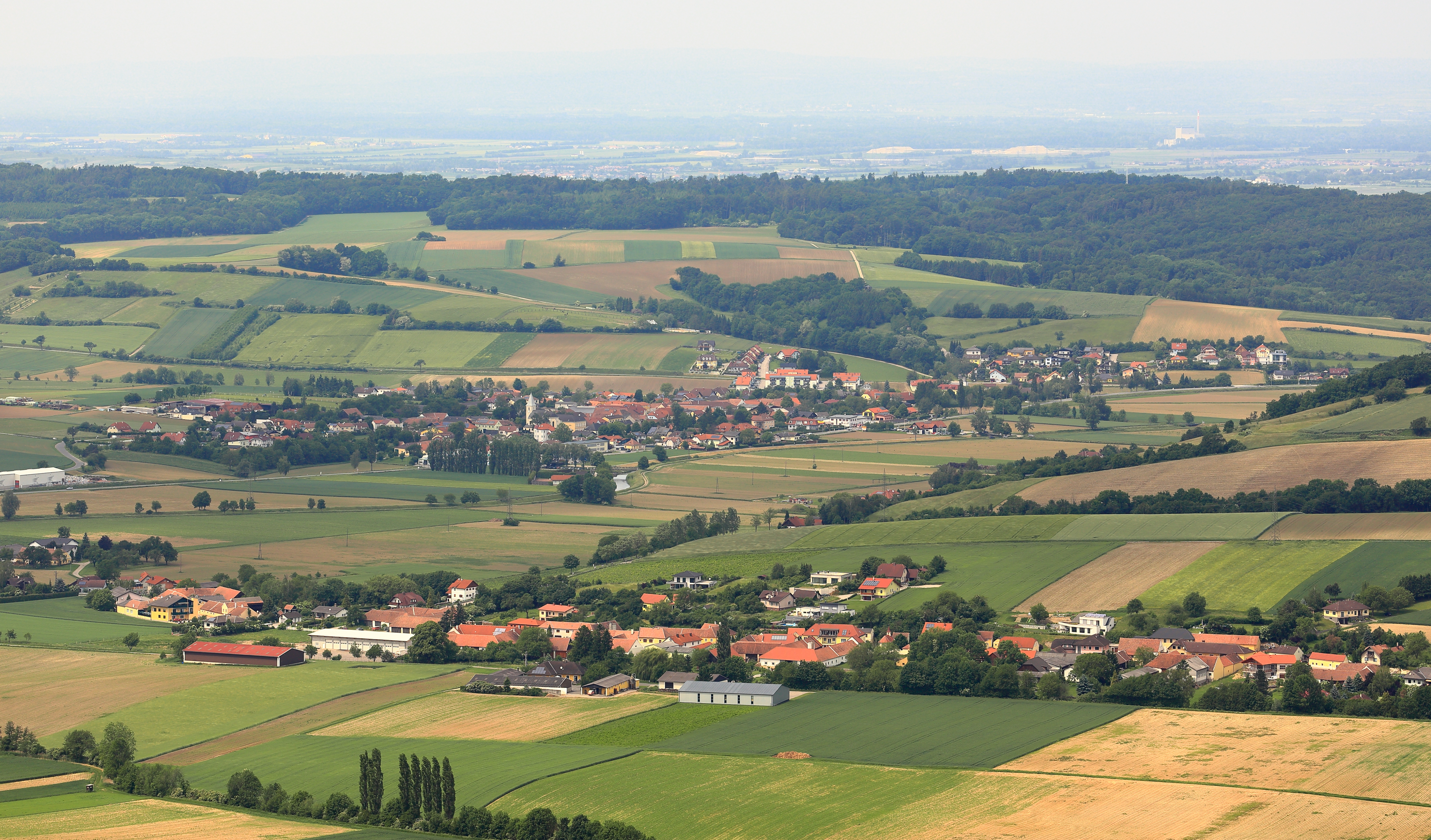
- Asperhofen

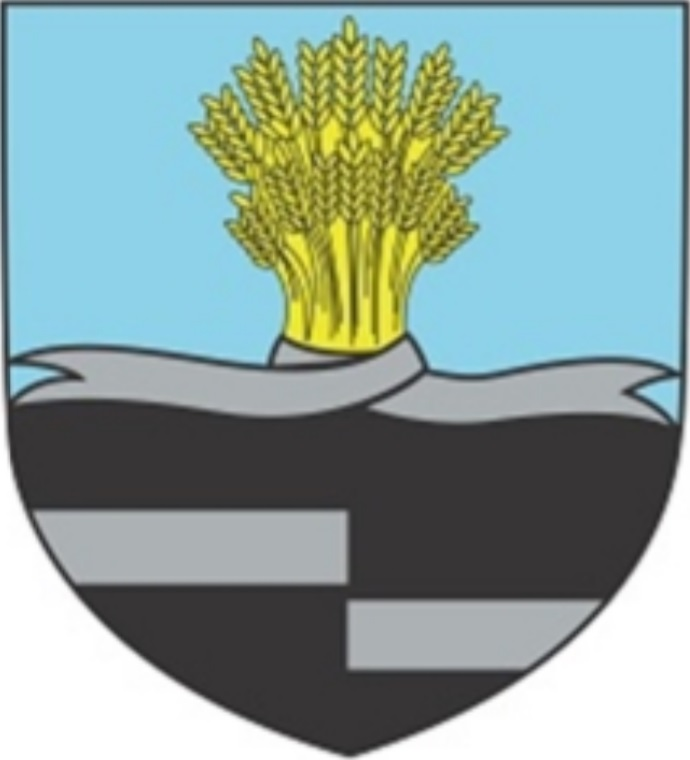
- Coat of arms

- Location within Austria
- Coordinates: 48°15′N 15°55′E
- Country: Austria
- State: Lower Austria
- District: Sankt Pölten-Land

Government
  - Mayor: Katharina Wolk (ÖVP)

Area
  - Total: 28.89 km^{2} (11.15 sq mi)
- Elevation: 212 m (696 ft)

Population (2018-01-01)
  - Total: 2,206
  - Density: 76.36/km^{2} (197.8/sq mi)
- Time zone: UTC+1 (CET)
  - Summer (DST): UTC+2 (CEST)
- Postal code: 3041
- Area code: 02772
- Website: http://www.asperhofen.at

Asperhofen is a town in the district of Sankt Pölten-Land in the Austrian state of Lower Austria.

== Geography ==
Asperhofen lies in the Mostviertel in Lower Austria, 6 km north of Neulengbach, on the edge of the Haspel Forest on the road to Tulln. About 20.87 percent of the municipality is forested.
