= Q distribution =

In mathematics and statistics, Q-distribution or q-distribution may refer to:

- Q-function, the tail distribution function of the standard normal distribution
- Studentized range distribution, the distribution followed by the q-statistic
- q-analog distributions:

- Gaussian q-distribution, a family of probability distributions that includes the uniform distribution and the Gaussian distribution
- q-Gaussian distribution, a type of Tsallis distribution
- q-exponential distribution, a type of Tsallis distribution
- q-Weibull distribution, a type of Tsallis distribution
