= Q-Weibull distribution =

Generalization of Weibull distribution

q-Weibull distribution
- Probability density function

- Cumulative distribution function
- Parameters: $q < 2$ shape (real) $\lambda > 0$ rate (real) $\kappa>0\,$ shape (real)
- Support: $x \in [0; +\infty)\! \text{ for }q \ge 1$ $x \in [0; {\lambda \over {(1-q)^{1/\kappa}}}) \text{ for } q<1$
- PDF: $$\begin{cases} (2-q)\frac{\kappa}{\lambda}\left(\frac{x}{\lambda}\right)^{\kappa-1}e_{q}^{-(x/\lambda)^{\kappa}} & x\geq0\\ 0 & x<0\end{cases}$$
- CDF: $$\begin{cases}1- e_{q'}^{-(x/\lambda')^\kappa} & x\geq0\\ 0 & x<0\end{cases}$$
- Mean: (see article)

In statistics, the q-Weibull distribution is a probability distribution that generalizes the Weibull distribution and the Lomax distribution (Pareto Type II). It is one example of a Tsallis distribution.

== Characterization ==
=== Probability density function ===
The probability density function of a q-Weibull random variable is:

$$f(x;q,\lambda,\kappa) =
\begin{cases}
(2-q)\frac{\kappa}{\lambda}\left(\frac{x}{\lambda}\right)^{\kappa-1} e_q(-(x/\lambda)^{\kappa})& x\geq0 ,\\
0 & x<0,
\end{cases}$$

where q < 2, $\kappa$ > 0 are shape parameters and λ > 0 is the scale parameter of the distribution and

$$e_q(x) = \begin{cases}
\exp(x) & \text{if }q=1, \\[6pt]
[1+(1-q)x]^{1/(1-q)} & \text{if }q \ne 1 \text{ and } 1+(1-q)x >0, \\[6pt]
0^{1/(1-q)} & \text{if }q \ne 1\text{ and }1+(1-q)x \le 0, \\[6pt]
\end{cases}$$

is the q-exponential

=== Cumulative distribution function ===
The cumulative distribution function of a q-Weibull random variable is:

$$\begin{cases}1- e_{q'}^{-(x/\lambda')^\kappa} & x\geq0\\ 0 & x<0\end{cases}$$

where

$$\lambda' = {\lambda \over (2-q)^{1 \over \kappa}}$$
$$q' = {1 \over (2-q)}$$

== Mean ==
The mean of the q-Weibull distribution is

$$\mu(q,\kappa,\lambda) =
\begin{cases}
\lambda\,\left(2+\frac{1}{1-q}+\frac{1}{\kappa}\right)(1-q)^{-\frac{1}{\kappa}}\,B\left[1+\frac{1}{\kappa},2+\frac{1}{1-q}\right]& q<1 \\
\lambda\,\Gamma(1+\frac{1}{\kappa}) & q=1\\
\lambda\,(2 - q) (q-1)^{-\frac{1+\kappa}{\kappa}}\,B\left[1+\frac{1}{\kappa}, -\left(1+\frac{1}{q-1}+\frac{1}{\kappa}\right)\right] & 1<q<1+\frac{1+2\kappa}{1+\kappa}\\
\infty & 1+\frac{\kappa}{\kappa+1}\le q<2
\end{cases}$$

where $B()$ is the Beta function and $\Gamma()$ is the Gamma function. The expression for the mean is a continuous function of q over the range of definition for which it is finite.

== Relationship to other distributions ==
The q-Weibull is equivalent to the Weibull distribution when q = 1 and equivalent to the q-exponential when $\kappa=1$

The q-Weibull is a generalization of the Weibull, as it extends this distribution to the cases of finite support (q < 1) and to include heavy-tailed distributions $(q \ge 1+\frac{\kappa}{\kappa+1})$.

The q-Weibull is a generalization of the Lomax distribution (Pareto Type II), as it extends this distribution to the cases of finite support and adds the $\kappa$ parameter. The Lomax parameters are:

$$\alpha = { {2-q} \over {q-1}} ~,~ \lambda_\text{Lomax} = {1 \over {\lambda (q-1)}}$$

As the Lomax distribution is a shifted version of the Pareto distribution, the q-Weibull for $\kappa=1$ is a shifted reparameterized generalization of the Pareto. When q > 1, the q-exponential is equivalent to the Pareto shifted to have support starting at zero. Specifically:

$$\text{If } X \sim \operatorname{\mathit{q}-Weibull}(q,\lambda,\kappa = 1) \text{ and } Y \sim \left[\operatorname{Pareto}
\left(
x_m = {1 \over {\lambda (q-1)}}, \alpha = { {2-q} \over {q-1}}
\right) -x_m
\right],
\text{ then } X \sim Y \,$$

== See also ==
- Constantino Tsallis
- Tsallis statistics
- Tsallis entropy
- Tsallis distribution
- q-Gaussian
