= Box and Cox =

Box and Cox may refer to:

- Box and Cox (farce), a comic play by John Maddison Morton first produced in 1847
- Box and Cox Publications, a London music publisher
- George Box and Sir David Cox, who devised the Box–Cox transformation to normalise data into a Box–Cox distribution

== See also ==
- Cox and Box, a one-act comic opera based on the 1847 play Box and Cox.
