= Quantum calculus =

Branch of mathematics

Quantum calculus, sometimes called calculus without limits, is equivalent to traditional infinitesimal calculus without the notion of limits. The two types of calculus in quantum calculus are q-calculus and h-calculus. The goal of both types is to find "analogs" of mathematical objects, where, after taking a certain limit, the original object is returned. In q-calculus, the limit as q tends to 1 is taken of the q-analog. Likewise, in h-calculus, the limit as h tends to 0 is taken of the h-analog. The parameters $q$ and $h$ can be related by the formula $q = e^h$.

== Differentiation ==
The q-differential and h-differential are defined as:

$$d_q(f(x)) = f(qx) - f(x)$$

and

$$d_h(f(x)) = f(x + h) - f(x),$$

respectively. The q-derivative and h-derivative are then defined as

$$D_q(f(x)) = \frac{d_q(f(x))}{d_q(x)} = \frac{f(qx) - f(x)}{qx - x}$$

and

$$D_h(f(x)) = \frac{d_h(f(x))}{d_h(x)} = \frac{f(x + h) - f(x)}{h}.$$

respectively. By taking the limit as $q \rightarrow 1$ of the q-derivative or as $h \rightarrow 0$ of the h-derivative, one can obtain the derivative:

$$\lim_{q \rightarrow 1} D_{q}f(x) = \lim_{h \rightarrow 0}D_h f(x) = \frac{d}{dx} f(x).$$

== Integration ==
=== q-integral ===
A function F(x) is a q-antiderivative of f(x) if D_{q}F(x) = f(x). The q-antiderivative (or q-integral) is denoted by $\int f(x) \, d_qx$ and an expression for F(x) can be found from:$\int f(x) \, d_qx = (1-q) \sum_{j=0}^\infty xq^j f(xq^j)$, which is called the Jackson integral of f(x). For 0 < q < 1, the series converges to a function F(x) on an interval (0,A] if |f(x)x^{α}| is bounded on the interval (0, A] for some 0 ≤ α < 1.

The q-integral is a Riemann–Stieltjes integral with respect to a step function having infinitely many points of increase at the points q^{j.}.The jump at the point q^{j} is q^{j}. Calling this step function g_{q}(t) gives dg_{q}(t) = d_{q}t.

=== h-integral ===
A function F(x) is an h-antiderivative of f(x) if D_{h}F(x) = f(x). The h-integral is denoted by $\int f(x) \, d_hx$. If a and b differ by an integer multiple of h then the definite integral $\int_a^b f(x) \, d_hx$ is given by a Riemann sum of f(x) on the interval [a, b], partitioned into sub-intervals of equal width h. The motivation of h-integral comes from the Riemann sum of f(x). Following the idea of the motivation of classical integrals, some of the properties of classical integrals hold in h-integral. This notion has broad applications in numerical analysis, and especially finite difference calculus.

== Example ==
In infinitesimal calculus, the derivative of the function $x^n$ is $nx^{n-1}$ (for some positive integer $n$). The corresponding expressions in q-calculus and h-calculus are:

$$D_q(x^n) = \frac{1- q^n}{1 - q} x^{n - 1} = [n]_q\ x^{n - 1}$$

where $[n]_q$ is the q-bracket

$$[n]_q = \frac{1 - q^n}{1 - q}$$

and

$$\begin{align}
D_h(x^n) &= \frac{(x+h)^n - x^n}{h} \\
&= \frac{1}{h}\left(\sum_{k=0}^n{\binom{n}{k} x^{n-k} h^k - x^n} \right) \\
&= \frac{1}{h}\sum_{k=1}^n{\binom{n}{k} x^{n-k} h^k} \\
&= \sum_{k=1}^n{\binom{n}{k} x^{n-k} h^{k-1}} \\
&= n x^{n - 1} + \frac{n(n-1)}{2} h x^{n - 2} + \cdots + n h^{n-2}x + h^{n - 1},
\end{align}$$

respectively. The expression $[n]_q x^{n - 1}$ is then the q-analog and $\sum_{k=1}^n{\binom{n}{k} x^{n-k} h^{k-1}}$ is the h-analog of the power rule for positive integral powers. The q-Taylor expansion allows for the definition of q-analogs of all of the usual functions, such as the sine function, whose q-derivative is the q-analog of cosine.

== History ==
The h-calculus is the calculus of finite differences, which was studied by George Boole and others, and has proven useful in combinatorics and fluid mechanics. In a sense, q-calculus dates back to Leonhard Euler and Carl Gustav Jacobi, but has only recently begun to find usefulness in quantum mechanics, given its intimate connection with commutativity relations and Lie algebras, specifically quantum groups.

== See also ==
- Noncommutative geometry
- Quantum differential calculus
- Time scale calculus
- q-analog
- Basic hypergeometric series
- Quantum dilogarithm
