= Jackson q-Bessel function =

In mathematics, a Jackson q-Bessel function (or basic Bessel function) is one of the three q-analogs of the Bessel function introduced by Jackson (1906a, 1906b, 1905a, 1905b). The third Jackson q-Bessel function is the same as the Hahn–Exton q-Bessel function.

== Definition ==
The three Jackson q-Bessel functions are given in terms of the q-Pochhammer symbol and the basic hypergeometric function $\phi$ by

$$J_\nu^{(1)}(x;q) = \frac{(q^{\nu+1};q)_\infty}{(q;q)_\infty} (x/2)^\nu {}_2\phi_1(0,0;q^{\nu+1};q,-x^2/4), \quad |x|<2,$$
$$J_\nu^{(2)}(x;q) = \frac{(q^{\nu+1};q)_\infty}{(q;q)_\infty} (x/2)^\nu {}_0\phi_1(;q^{\nu+1};q,-x^2q^{\nu +1}/4), \quad x\in\mathbb{C},$$
$$J_\nu^{(3)}(x;q) = \frac{(q^{\nu+1};q)_\infty}{(q;q)_\infty} (x/2)^\nu {}_1\phi_1(0;q^{\nu+1};q,qx^2/4), \quad x\in\mathbb{C}.$$

They can be reduced to the Bessel function by the continuous limit:

$$\lim_{q\to1}J_\nu^{(k)}(x(1-q);q)=J_\nu(x), \ k=1,2,3.$$

There is a connection formula between the first and second Jackson q-Bessel function (Gasper & Rahman (2004)):

$$J_\nu^{(2)}(x;q)=(-x^2/4;q)_\infty J_\nu^{(1)}(x;q), \ |x|<2.$$

For integer order, the q-Bessel functions satisfy

$$J_n^{(k)}(-x;q)=(-1)^n J_n^{(k)}(x;q), \ n\in\mathbb{Z}, \ k=1,2,3.$$

== Properties ==
=== Negative Integer Order ===
By using the relations (Gasper & Rahman (2004)):

$$(q^{m+1};q)_\infty=(q^{m+n+1};q)_\infty (q^{m+1};q)_n,$$
$$(q;q)_{m+n}=(q;q)_m (q^{m+1};q)_n,\ m,n\in\mathbb{Z},$$

we obtain

$$J_{-n}^{(k)}(x;q)=(-1)^n J_n^{(k)}(x;q), \ k=1,2.$$

=== Zeros ===
Hahn mentioned that $J_\nu^{(2)}(x;q)$ has infinitely many real zeros (Hahn (1949)). Ismail proved that for $\nu>-1$ all non-zero roots of $J_\nu^{(2)}(x;q)$ are real (Ismail (1982)).

=== Ratio of q-Bessel Functions ===
The function $-ix^{-1/2}J_{\nu+1}^{(2)}(ix^{1/2};q)/J_{\nu}^{(2)}(ix^{1/2};q)$ is a completely monotonic function (Ismail (1982)).

=== Recurrence Relations ===
The first and second Jackson q-Bessel function have the following recurrence relations (see Ismail (1982) and Gasper & Rahman (2004)):

$$q^\nu J_{\nu+1}^{(k)}(x;q)=\frac{2(1-q^\nu)}{x}J_\nu^{(k)}(x;q)-J_{\nu-1}^{(k)}(x;q), \ k=1,2.$$
$$J_{\nu}^{(1)}(x\sqrt{q};q)=q^{\pm\nu/2}\left(J_\nu^{(1)}(x;q)\pm \frac{x}{2}J_{\nu\pm1}^{(1)}(x;q)\right).$$

=== Inequalities ===
When $\nu>-1$, the second Jackson q-Bessel function satisfies: $\left|J_{\nu}^{(2)}(z;q)\right|\leq\frac{(-\sqrt{q};q)_{\infty}}{(q;q)_{\infty}}\left(\frac{|z|}{2}\right)^\nu\exp\left\{\frac{\log\left(|z|^2q^\nu/4\right)}{2\log q}\right\}.$ (see Zhang (2006).)

For $n\in\mathbb{Z}$, $\left|J_{n}^{(2)}(z;q)\right|\leq\frac{(-q^{n+1};q)_{\infty}}{(q;q)_{\infty}}\left(\frac{|z|}{2}\right)^n(-|z|^2;q)_{\infty}.$ (see Koelink (1993).)

=== Generating Function ===
The following formulas are the q-analog of the generating function for the Bessel function (see Gasper & Rahman (2004)):

$$\sum_{n=-\infty}^{\infty}t^nJ_n^{(2)}(x;q)=(-x^2/4;q)_{\infty}e_q(xt/2)e_q(-x/2t),$$
$$\sum_{n=-\infty}^{\infty}t^nJ_n^{(3)}(x;q)=e_q(xt/2)E_q(-qx/2t).$$

$e_q$ is the q-exponential function.

== Alternative Representations ==
=== Integral Representations ===
The second Jackson q-Bessel function has the following integral representations (see Rahman (1987) and Ismail & Zhang (2018a)):

$$J_{\nu}^{(2)}(x;q)=\frac{(q^{2\nu};q)_{\infty}}{2\pi(q^{\nu};q)_{\infty}}(x/2)^{\nu}
\cdot\int_0^{\pi} \frac{\left(e^{2i\theta}, e^{-2i\theta},-\frac{i x q^{(\nu+1)/2}}{2}e^{i\theta}, -\frac{i x q^{(\nu+1)/2}}{2}e^{-i\theta};q\right)_{\infty}}{(e^{2i\theta}q^{\nu}, e^{-2i\theta}q^{\nu};q)_{\infty}}\,d\theta,$$
$$(a_1,a_2,\cdots,a_n;q)_{\infty}:=(a_1;q)_{\infty}(a_2;q)_{\infty}\cdots(a_n;q)_{\infty}, \ \Re \nu>0,$$

where $(a;q)_{\infty}$ is the q-Pochhammer symbol. This representation reduces to the integral representation of the Bessel function in the limit $q\to 1$.

$$J_{\nu}^{(2)}(z;q)=\frac{(z/2)^\nu}{\sqrt{2\pi\log q^{-1}}}\int_{-\infty}^{\infty}\frac{\left(\frac{q^{\nu+1/2}z^2e^{ix}}{4};q\right)_{\infty}\exp\left(\frac{x^2}{\log q^2}\right)}{(q,-q^{\nu+1/2}e^{ix};q)_{\infty}}\,dx.$$

=== Hypergeometric Representations ===
The second Jackson q-Bessel function has the following hypergeometric representations (see Koelink (1993), Chen, Ismail, and Muttalib (1994)):

$$J_{\nu}^{(2)}(x;q)=\frac{(x/2)^{\nu}}{(q;q)_{\infty}}\ _1\phi_1(-x^2/4;0;q,q^{\nu+1}),$$
$$J_{\nu}^{(2)}(x;q)=\frac{(x/2)^{\nu}(\sqrt{q};q)_{\infty}}{2(q;q)_{\infty}}[f(x/2,q^{(\nu+1/2)/2};q)+f(-x/2,q^{(\nu+1/2)/2};q)], \ f(x,a;q):=(iax;\sqrt{q})_\infty \ _3\phi_2 \left(\begin{matrix}
a, & -a, & 0 \\
-\sqrt{q}, & iax \end{matrix}
; \sqrt{q},\sqrt{q} \right).$$

An asymptotic expansion can be obtained as an immediate consequence of the second formula.

For other hypergeometric representations, see Rahman (1987).

== Modified q-Bessel Functions ==
The q-analog of the modified Bessel functions are defined with the Jackson q-Bessel function (Ismail (1981) and Olshanetsky & Rogov (1995)):

$$I_\nu^{(j)}(x;q)=e^{i\nu\pi/2}J_{\nu}^{(j)}(x;q), \ j=1,2.$$
$$K_\nu^{(j)}(x;q)=\frac{\pi}{2\sin(\pi\nu)}\left\{I_{-\nu}^{(j)}(x;q)-I_\nu^{(j)}(x;q)\right\}, \ j=1,2,\ \nu\in\mathbb{C}-\mathbb{Z},$$
$$K_n^{(j)}(x;q)=\lim_{\nu\to n}K_\nu^{(j)}(x;q),\ n\in\mathbb{Z}.$$

There is a connection formula between the modified q-Bessel functions:

$$I_\nu^{(2)}(x;q)=(-x^2/4;q)_\infty I_\nu^{(1)}(x;q).$$

For statistical applications, see Kemp (1997).

=== Recurrence Relations ===
By the recurrence relation of Jackson q-Bessel functions and the definition of modified q-Bessel functions, the following recurrence relation can be obtained ($K_\nu^{(j)}(x;q)$ also satisfies the same relation) (Ismail (1981)):

$$q^\nu I_{\nu+1}^{(j)}(x;q)=\frac{2}{z}(1-q^\nu)I_\nu^{(j)}(x;q)+I_{\nu-1}^{(j)}(x;q), \ j=1, 2.$$

For other recurrence relations, see Olshanetsky & Rogov (1995).

=== Continued Fraction Representation ===
The ratio of modified q-Bessel functions form a continued fraction (Ismail (1981)):

$$\frac{I_\nu^{(2)}(z;q)}{I_{\nu-1}^{(2)}(z;q)}=\cfrac{1}{2(1-q^\nu)/z+\cfrac{q^\nu}{2(1-q^{\nu+1})/z+\cfrac{q^{\nu+1}}{2(1-q^{\nu+2})/z+\ddots}}}.$$

=== Alternative Representations ===
==== Hypergeometric Representations ====
The function $I_\nu^{(2)}(z;q)$ has the following representation (Ismail & Zhang (2018b)):

$$I_\nu^{(2)}(z;q)=\frac{(z/2)^\nu}{(q,q)_{\infty}} {}_1\phi_1(z^2/4;0;q,q^{\nu+1}).$$

==== Integral Representations ====
The modified q-Bessel functions have the following integral representations (Ismail (1981)):

$$I_\nu^{(2)}(z;q)=\left(z^2/4;q\right)_\infty\left(\frac{1}{\pi}\int_0^\pi\frac{\cos\nu\theta\,d\theta}{\left(e^{i\theta}z/2;q\right)_\infty\left(e^{-i\theta}z/2;q\right)_\infty}-\frac{\sin\nu\pi}{\pi}\int_0^\infty\frac{e^{-\nu t}\,dt}{\left(-e^t z/2;q\right)_\infty\left(-e^{-t}z/2;q\right)_\infty}\right),$$
$$K_\nu^{(1)}(z;q)=\frac{1}{2}\int_0^\infty\frac{e^{-\nu t}\,dt}{\left(-e^{t/2} z/2;q\right)_\infty\left(-e^{-t/2}z/2;q\right)_\infty},\ |\arg z|<\pi/2,$$
$$K_\nu^{(1)}(z;q)=\int_0^\infty\frac{\cosh\nu \,dt}{\left(-e^{t/2} z/2;q\right)_\infty\left(-e^{-t/2}z/2;q\right)_\infty}.$$

== See also ==
- q-Bessel polynomials
