= Q-exponential distribution =

Generalization of exponential distribution

q-exponential distribution
- Probability density function
- Parameters: $q < 2$ shape (real) $\lambda > 0$ rate (real)
- Support: $x \in [0, \infty) \text{ for } q \ge 1$ $x \in \left[0, \frac{1}{\lambda(1-q)}\right) \text{ for } q<1$
- PDF: $(2-q) \lambda e_q(-\lambda x)$
- CDF: $1-e_{q'}^{-\lambda x / q'} \text{ where } q' = \frac{1}{2-q}$
- Mean: $\frac{1}{\lambda (3-2q)} \text{ for } q < \frac{3}{2}$ Otherwise undefined
- Median: $\frac{-q' \ln_{q'}(1/2)}{\lambda} \text{ where } q' = \frac{1}{2-q}$
- Mode: 0
- Variance: $\frac{q-2}{(2q-3)^2 (3q-4) \lambda^2} \text{ for } q < \frac{4}{3}$
- Skewness: $\frac{2}{5-4q} \sqrt{\frac{3q-4}{q-2}} \text{ for } q < \frac{5}{4}$
- Excess kurtosis: $6\frac{-4q^3 + 17q^2 - 20q + 6} {(q-2)(4q-5)(5q-6)} \text{ for } q < \frac{6}{5}$

The q-exponential distribution is a probability distribution arising from the maximization of the Tsallis entropy under appropriate constraints, including constraining the domain to be positive. It is one example of a Tsallis distribution. The q-exponential is a generalization of the exponential distribution in the same way that Tsallis entropy is a generalization of standard Boltzmann–Gibbs entropy or Shannon entropy. The exponential distribution is recovered as $q \rightarrow 1.$

Originally proposed by the statisticians George Box and David Cox in 1964, and known as the reverse Box–Cox transformation for $q=1-\lambda,$ a particular case of power transform in statistics.

== Characterization ==
=== Probability density function ===
The q-exponential distribution has the probability density function

$$(2-q) \lambda e_q(-\lambda x)$$

where

$$e_q(x) = [1+(1-q)x]^{1/(1-q)}$$

is the q-exponential if q ≠ 1. When q = 1, e_{q}(x) is just exp(x).

== Derivation ==
In a similar procedure to how the exponential distribution can be derived (using the standard Boltzmann–Gibbs entropy or Shannon entropy and constraining the domain of the variable to be positive), the q-exponential distribution can be derived from a maximization of the Tsallis Entropy subject to the appropriate constraints.

== Relationship to other distributions ==
The q-exponential is a special case of the generalized Pareto distribution where

$$\mu = 0,\quad \xi = \frac{q-1}{2-q} ,\quad \sigma = \frac{1}{\lambda (2-q)}.$$

The q-exponential is the generalization of the Lomax distribution (Pareto Type II), as it extends this distribution to the cases of finite support. The Lomax parameters are:

$$\alpha = \frac{2-q}{q-1} ,\quad \lambda_\mathrm{Lomax} = \frac{1}{\lambda (q-1)}.$$

As the Lomax distribution is a shifted version of the Pareto distribution, the q-exponential is a shifted reparameterized generalization of the Pareto. When q > 1, the q-exponential is equivalent to the Pareto shifted to have support starting at zero. Specifically, if

$$X \sim \operatorname{\mathit{q}-Exp}(q,\lambda) \text{ and }
Y \sim \left[\operatorname{Pareto}\left(x_m = \frac{1}{\lambda (q-1)}, \alpha = \frac{2-q}{q-1}\right) -x_m\right],$$

then $X \sim Y.$

== Generating random deviates ==
Random deviates can be drawn using inverse transform sampling. Given a variable U that is uniformly distributed on the interval (0,1), then

$$X = \frac{-q' \ln_{q'}(U)}{\lambda} \sim \operatorname{\mathit{q}-Exp}(q,\lambda)$$

where $\ln_{q'}$ is the q-logarithm and $q' = \frac{1}{2-q}.$

== Applications ==
Being a power transform, it is a usual technique in statistics for stabilizing the variance, making the data more normal distribution-like and improving the validity of measures of association such as the Pearson correlation between variables. It has been found to be an accurate model for train delays. It is also found in atomic physics and quantum optics, for example processes of molecular condensate creation via transition through the Feshbach resonance.

== See also ==
- Constantino Tsallis
- Tsallis statistics
- Tsallis entropy
- Tsallis distribution
- q-copula
- q-Gaussian
