= Q-derivative =

Q-analog of the ordinary derivative

In mathematics, in the area of combinatorics and quantum calculus, the q-derivative, or Jackson derivative, is a q-analog of the ordinary derivative, introduced by Frank Hilton Jackson. It is the inverse of Jackson's q-integration. For other forms of q-derivative, see Chung et al. (1994).

== Definition ==
The q-derivative of a function f(x) is defined as

$$\left(\frac{d}{dx}\right)_q f(x)=\frac{f(qx)-f(x)}{qx-x}.$$

It is also often written as $D_qf(x)$. The q-derivative is also known as the Jackson derivative.

Formally, in terms of Lagrange's shift operator in logarithmic variables, it amounts to the operator
$$D_q= \frac{1}{x} ~ \frac{q^{d~~~ \over d (\ln x)}  -1}{q-1} ~,$$
which goes to the plain derivative, $D_q \to \frac{d}{dx}$ as $q \to 1$.

It is manifestly linear,
$$\displaystyle D_q (f(x)+g(x)) = D_q f(x) + D_q g(x)~.$$

It has a product rule analogous to the ordinary derivative product rule, with two equivalent forms

$$\displaystyle D_q (f(x)g(x)) = g(x)D_q f(x) + f(qx)D_q g(x) = g(qx)D_q f(x) + f(x)D_q g(x).$$

Similarly, it satisfies a quotient rule,

$$\displaystyle D_q (f(x)/g(x)) = \frac{g(x)D_q f(x) - f(x)D_q g(x)}{g(qx)g(x)},\quad g(x)g(qx)\neq 0.$$

There is also a rule similar to the chain rule for ordinary derivatives. Let $g(x) = c x^k$. Then

$$\displaystyle D_q f(g(x)) = D_{q^k}(f)(g(x))D_q(g)(x).$$

The eigenfunction of the q-derivative is the q-exponential e_{q}(x).

== Relationship to ordinary derivatives ==
Q-differentiation resembles ordinary differentiation, with curious differences. For example, the q-derivative of the monomial is:

$$\left(\frac{d}{dz}\right)_q z^n = \frac{1-q^n}{1-q} z^{n-1} =
[n]_q z^{n-1}$$

where $[n]_q$ is the q-bracket of n. Note that $\lim_{q\to 1}[n]_q = n$ so the ordinary derivative is regained in this limit.

The n-th q-derivative of a function may be given as:

$$(D^n_q f)(0)=
\frac{f^{(n)}(0)}{n!} \frac{(q;q)_n}{(1-q)^n}=
\frac{f^{(n)}(0)}{n!} [n]!_q$$

provided that the ordinary n-th derivative of f exists at x = 0. Here, $(q;q)_n$ is the q-Pochhammer symbol, and $[n]!_q$ is the q-factorial. If $f(x)$ is analytic we can apply the Taylor formula to the definition of $D_q(f(x))$ to get

$$\displaystyle D_q(f(x)) = \sum_{k=0}^{\infty}\frac{(q-1)^k}{(k+1)!} x^k f^{(k+1)}(x).$$

A q-analog of the Taylor expansion of a function about zero follows:

$$f(z)=\sum_{n=0}^\infty f^{(n)}(0)\,\frac{z^n}{n!} = \sum_{n=0}^\infty (D^n_q f)(0)\,\frac{z^n}{[n]!_q}.$$

== Higher order q-derivatives ==
The following representation for higher order $q$-derivatives is known:
$$D_q^nf(x)=\frac{1}{(1-q)^nx^n}\sum_{k=0}^n(-1)^k\binom{n}{k}_q q^{\binom{k}{2}-(n-1)k}f(q^kx).$$
$\binom{n}{k}_q$ is the $q$-binomial coefficient. By changing the order of summation as $r=n-k$, we obtain the next formula:
$$D_q^nf(x)=\frac{(-1)^n q^{-\binom{n}{2}}}{(1-q)^nx^n}\sum_{r=0}^n(-1)^r\binom{n}{r}_q q^{\binom{r}{2}}f(q^{n-r}x).$$

Higher order $q$-derivatives are used to $q$-Taylor formula and the $q$-Rodrigues' formula (the formula used to construct $q$-orthogonal polynomials).

== Generalizations ==
=== Post Quantum Calculus ===
Post quantum calculus is a generalization of the theory of quantum calculus, and it uses the following operator:
$$D_{p,q}f(x):=\frac{f(px)-f(qx)}{(p-q)x},\quad x\neq 0.$$

=== Hahn difference ===
Wolfgang Hahn introduced the following operator (Hahn difference):
$$D_{q,\omega}f(x):=\frac{f(qx+\omega)-f(x)}{(q-1)x+\omega},\quad 0<q<1,\quad\omega>0.$$

When $\omega\to0$ this operator reduces to $q$-derivative, and when $q\to1$ it reduces to forward difference. This is a successful tool for constructing families of orthogonal polynomials and investigating some approximation problems.

=== β-derivative ===
$\beta$-derivative is an operator defined as follows:
$$D_\beta f(t):=\frac{f(\beta(t))-f(t)}{\beta(t)-t},\quad\beta\neq t,\quad\beta:I\to I.$$

In the definition, $I$ is a given interval, and $\beta(t)$ is any continuous function that strictly monotonically increases (i.e. $t>s\rightarrow\beta(t)>\beta(s)$). When $\beta(t)=qt$ then this operator is $q$-derivative, and when $\beta(t)=qt+\omega$ this operator is Hahn difference.

== Applications ==
The q-calculus has been used in machine learning for designing stochastic activation functions.

== See also ==
- Derivative (generalizations)
- Jackson integral
- Q-exponential
- Q-difference polynomials
- Quantum calculus
- Tsallis entropy

== Bibliography ==
- Annaby, M. H.; Mansour, Z. S. (2008). "q-Taylor and interpolation-difference operators". Journal of Mathematical Analysis and Applications. 344 (1): 472–483. doi:10.1016/j.jmaa.2008.02.033.
- Chung, K. S.; Chung, W. S.; Nam, S. T.; Kang, H. J. (1994). "New q-derivative and q-logarithm". International Journal of Theoretical Physics. 33 (10): 2019–2029. Bibcode:1994IJTP...33.2019C. doi:10.1007/BF00675167. S2CID 117685233.
- Duran, U. (2016). Post Quantum Calculus (M.Sc. thesis). Department of Mathematics, University of Gaziantep Graduate School of Natural & Applied Sciences – via ResearchGate.
- Ernst, T. (2012). A comprehensive treatment of q-calculus. Springer Science & Business Media. ISBN 978-303480430-1.
- Ernst, Thomas (2001). "The History of q-Calculus and a new method" (PDF). Archived from the original (PDF) on 28 November 2009.
- Exton, H. (1983). q-Hypergeometric Functions and Applications. New York: Halstead Press. ISBN 978-047027453-8.
- Foupouagnigni, M. (1998). Laguerre-Hahn orthogonal polynomials with respect to the Hahn operator: fourth-order difference equation for the rth associated and the Laguerre-Freud equations for the recurrence coefficients (Ph.D. thesis). Université Nationale du Bénin.
- Hamza, A.; Sarhan, A.; Shehata, E.; Aldwoah, K. (2015). "A General Quantum Difference Calculus". Advances in Difference Equations. 1 182. doi:10.1186/s13662-015-0518-3. S2CID 54790288.
- Jackson, F. H. (1908). "On q-functions and a certain difference operator". Trans. R. Soc. Edinb. 46 (2): 253–281. doi:10.1017/S0080456800002751. S2CID 123927312.
- Kac, Victor; Pokman Cheung (2002). Quantum Calculus. Springer-Verlag. ISBN 0-387-95341-8.
- Koekoek, J.; Koekoek, R. (1999). "A note on the q-derivative operator". J. Math. Anal. Appl. 176 (2): 627–634. arXiv:math/9908140. doi:10.1006/jmaa.1993.1237. S2CID 329394.
- Koepf, W.; Rajković, P. M.; Marinković, S. D. (July 2007). "Properties of q-holonomic functions". Journal of Difference Equations and Applications. 13 (7): 621–638. CiteSeerX 10.1.1.298.4595. doi:10.1080/10236190701264925. S2CID 123079843.
- Koepf, Wolfram (2014). Hypergeometric Summation. An Algorithmic Approach to Summation and Special Function Identities. Springer. ISBN 978-1-4471-6464-7.
- Nielsen, Frank; Sun, Ke (2021). "q-Neurons: Neuron Activations Based on Stochastic Jackson's Derivative Operators". IEEE Trans. Neural Netw. Learn. Syst. 32 (6): 2782–2789. arXiv:1806.00149. Bibcode:2021ITNNL..32.2782N. doi:10.1109/TNNLS.2020.3005167. PMID 32886614. S2CID 44143912.
