= Gaussian q-distribution =

Family of probability distributions

In mathematical physics and probability and statistics, the Gaussian q-distribution is a family of probability distributions that includes, as limiting cases, the uniform distribution and the normal (Gaussian) distribution. It was introduced by Diaz and Teruel. It is a q-analog of the Gaussian or normal distribution.

The distribution is symmetric about zero and is bounded, except for the limiting case of the normal distribution. The limiting uniform distribution is on the range -1 to +1.

== Definition ==
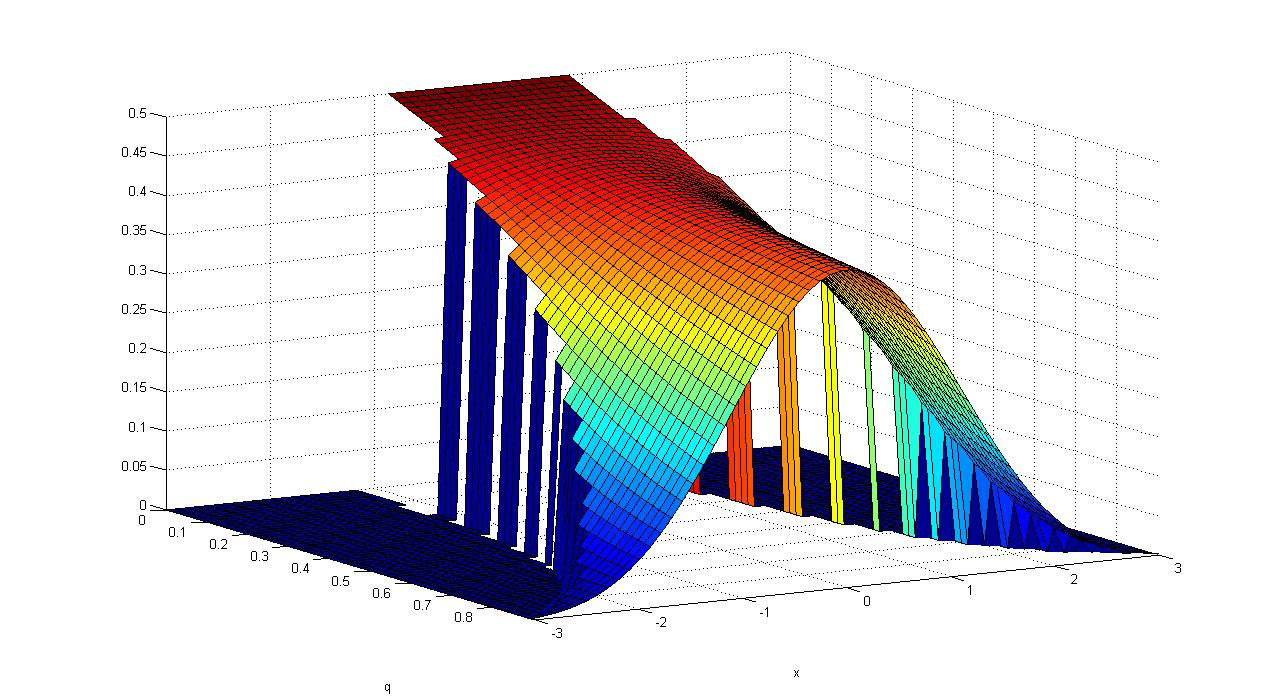
The Gaussian q-density.

Let q be a real number in the interval [0, 1). The probability density function of the Gaussian q-distribution is given by

$$s_q(x) = \begin{cases} 0 & \text{if }  x < -\nu  \\ \frac{1}{c(q)}E_{q^2}^{\frac{-q^2x^2}{[2]_q}}  & \text{if } -\nu \leq x \leq \nu \\ 0 & \mbox{if } x >\nu. \end{cases}$$

where

$$\nu = \nu(q) = \frac{1}{\sqrt{1-q}} ,$$

$$c(q)=2(1-q)^{1/2}\sum_{m=0}^\infty \frac{(-1)^m q^{m(m+1)}}{(1-q^{2m+1})(1-q^2)_{q^2}^m} .$$

The q-analogue [t]_{q} of the real number $t$ is given by

$$[t]_q=\frac{q^t-1}{q-1}.$$

The q-analogue of the exponential function is the q-exponential, E^{x}_{q}, which is given by

$$E_q^{x}=\sum_{j=0}^{\infty}q^{j(j-1)/2}\frac{x^{j}}{[j]!}$$

where the q-analogue of the factorial is the q-factorial, [n]_{q}!, which is in turn given by

$$[n]_q!=[n]_q[n-1]_q\cdots [2]_q \,$$

for an integer n > 2 and [1]_{q}! = [0]_{q}! = 1.

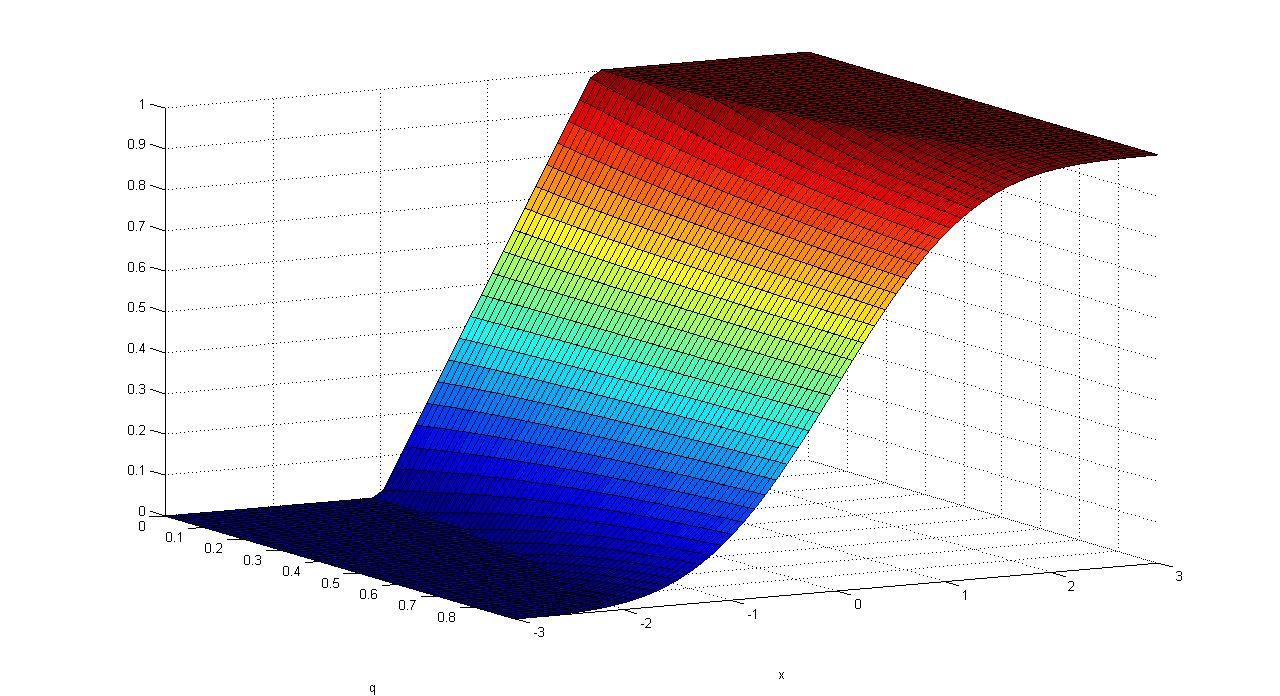
The Cumulative Gaussian q-distribution.

The cumulative distribution function of the Gaussian q-distribution is given by

$$G_q(x) = \begin{cases} 0 & \text{if } x < -\nu \\[12pt]
\displaystyle \frac{1}{c(q)}\int_{-\nu}^{x} E_{q^2}^{-q^2 t^2/[2]} \, d_qt & \text{if }  -\nu \leq x \leq \nu \\[12pt]
1 & \text{if } x>\nu
\end{cases}$$

where the integration symbol denotes the Jackson integral.

The function G_{q} is given explicitly by

$$G_q(x)= \begin{cases}  0 & \text{if } x < -\nu, \\
\displaystyle \frac{1}{2} + \frac{1-q}{c(q)} \sum_{n=0}^\infty \frac{q^{n(n+1)}(q-1)^n}{(1-q^{2n+1})(1-q^2)_{q^2}^{n}}x^{2n+1} &  \text{if } -\nu \leq x \leq \nu \\
1 & \text{if}\ x > \nu
\end{cases}$$

where

$$(a+b)_q^n=\prod_{i=0}^{n-1}(a+q^ib) .$$

== Moments ==
The moments of the Gaussian q-distribution are given by

$$\frac{1}{c(q)}\int_{-\nu}^\nu E_{q^2}^{-q^2 x^2/[2]} \, x^{2n} \, d_qx =[2n-1]!! ,$$

$$\frac{1}{c(q)}\int_{-\nu}^\nu E_{q^{2}}^{-q^2 x^2/[2]} \, x^{2n+1} \, d_qx=0 ,$$

where the symbol [2n − 1]!! is the q-analogue of the double factorial given by

$$[2n-1][2n-3]\cdots[1]= [2n-1]!!. \,$$

== See also ==
- Q-Gaussian process
