= Tsallis distribution =

Probability distribution

In statistics, a Tsallis distribution is a probability distribution derived from the maximization of the Tsallis entropy under appropriate constraints. There are several different families of Tsallis distributions, yet different sources may reference an individual family as "the Tsallis distribution". The q-Gaussian is a generalization of the Gaussian in the same way that Tsallis entropy is a generalization of standard Boltzmann–Gibbs entropy or Shannon entropy. Similarly, if the domain of the variable is constrained to be positive in the maximum entropy procedure, the q-exponential distribution is derived.

The Tsallis distributions have been applied to problems in the fields of statistical mechanics, geology, anatomy, astronomy, economics, finance, and machine learning. The distributions are often used for their heavy tails.

Note that Tsallis distributions are obtained as Box–Cox transformation over usual distributions, with deformation parameter $\lambda=1-q$. This deformation transforms exponentials into q-exponentials.

== Procedure ==
In a similar procedure to how the normal distribution can be derived using the standard Boltzmann–Gibbs entropy or Shannon entropy, the q-Gaussian can be derived from a maximization of the Tsallis entropy subject to the appropriate constraints.

== Common Tsallis distributions ==
=== q-Gaussian ===
See q-Gaussian.

=== q-exponential distribution ===
See q-exponential distribution

=== q-Weibull distribution ===
See q-Weibull distribution

== See also ==
- Constantino Tsallis
- Tsallis statistics
- Tsallis entropy
