= Tsallis statistics =

Collection of mathematical functions originated by Constantino Tsallis

The term Tsallis statistics usually refers to the collection of mathematical functions and associated probability distributions that were originated by Constantino Tsallis. Using that collection, it is possible to derive Tsallis distributions from the optimization of the Tsallis entropic form. A continuous real parameter q can be used to adjust the distributions, so that distributions which have properties intermediate to that of Gaussian and Lévy distributions can be created. The parameter q represents the degree of non-extensivity of the distribution. Tsallis statistics are useful for characterising complex, anomalous diffusion.

== Tsallis functions ==
The q-deformed exponential and logarithmic functions were first introduced in Tsallis statistics in 1994. However, the q-logarithm is the Box–Cox transformation for $q=1-\lambda$, proposed by George Box and David Cox in 1964.

=== q-exponential ===
The q-exponential is a deformation of the exponential function using the real parameter q.

$$e_q(x) = \begin{cases}
\exp(x) & \text{if }q=1, \\[6pt]
[1+(1-q)x]^{1/(1-q)} & \text{if }q \ne 1 \text{ and } 1+(1-q)x >0, \\[6pt]
0^{1/(1-q)} & \text{if }q \ne 1\text{ and }1+(1-q)x \le 0, \\[6pt]
\end{cases}$$

Note that the q-exponential in Tsallis statistics is different from a version used elsewhere.

=== q-logarithm ===
The q-logarithm is the inverse of q-exponential and a deformation of the logarithm using the real parameter q.

$$\ln_q(x) = \begin{cases}
\ln(x) & \text{if }x> 0 \text{ and }q=1\\[8pt]
\dfrac{x^{1-q} - 1}{1-q} & \text{if }x> 0 \text{ and }q\ne 1\\[8pt]
\text{Undefined } & \text{if }x\le 0\\[8pt]
\end{cases}$$

=== Inverses ===
These functions have the property that

$$\begin{cases} e_q( \ln_q(x)) = x & (x>0)\\
\ln_q( e_q(x) ) = x & (0<e_q(x)<\infty)\\
\end{cases}$$

=== Analysis ===
The $q\to 1$ limits of the above expression can be understood by considering $\left(1+\frac{x}{N}\right)^N \approx {\rm e}^x$ for the exponential function and $N\left(x^{\frac{1}{N}}-1\right)\approx \log(x)$ for the logarithm, in the limit $N = \frac{1}{1-q}\to \infty$.

== See also ==
- Tsallis entropy
- Tsallis distribution
- q-Gaussian
- q-exponential distribution
- q-Weibull distribution
