= Power transformation =

Power transformation may refer to:

- Energy transformation
- Power transform
