= Q-difference polynomial =

In combinatorial mathematics, the q-difference polynomials or q-harmonic polynomials are a polynomial sequence defined in terms of the q-derivative. They are a generalized type of Brenke polynomial, and generalize the Appell polynomials. See also Sheffer sequence.

== Definition ==
The q-difference polynomials satisfy the relation

$$\left(\frac {d}{dz}\right)_q p_n(z) =
\frac{p_n(qz)-p_n(z)} {qz-z} = \frac{q^n-1} {q-1} p_{n-1}(z)=[n]_qp_{n-1}(z)$$

where the derivative symbol on the left is the q-derivative. In the limit of $q\to 1$, this becomes the definition of the Appell polynomials:

$$\frac{d}{dz}p_n(z) = np_{n-1}(z).$$

== Generating function ==
The generalized generating function for these polynomials is of the type of generating function for Brenke polynomials, namely

$$A(w)e_q(zw) = \sum_{n=0}^\infty \frac{p_n(z)}{[n]_q!} w^n$$

where $e_q(t)$ is the q-exponential:

$$e_q(t)=\sum_{n=0}^\infty \frac{t^n}{[n]_q!}=
\sum_{n=0}^\infty \frac{t^n (1-q)^n}{(q;q)_n}.$$

Here, $[n]_q!$ is the q-factorial and

$$(q;q)_n=(1-q^n)(1-q^{n-1})\cdots (1-q)$$

is the q-Pochhammer symbol. The function $A(w)$ is arbitrary but assumed to have an expansion

$$A(w)=\sum_{n=0}^\infty a_n w^n \mbox{ with } a_0 \ne 0.$$

Any such $A(w)$ gives a sequence of q-difference polynomials.
