= William Spence (mathematician) =

Scottish mathematician (1777–1815)

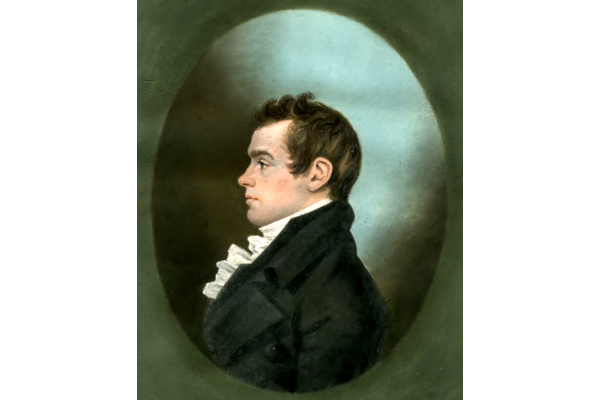
- Born: 31 July 1777; Greenock, Scotland
- Died: 20 May 1815 (aged 37); Glasgow, Scotland
- Parents: Ninian Spence (father); Sarah Townsend (mother)

Notes
- A D D Craik, The 'Mathematical Essays' of William Spence (1777–1815), Historia Mathematica 40: 4 (2013), 386–422. Image accredited to the Watt Institute, Inverclyde Council

William Spence (born 31 July 1777 in Greenock, Scotland – died 22 May 1815 in Glasgow, Scotland) was a Scottish mathematician who published works on the fields of logarithmic functions, algebraic equations and their relation to integral and differential calculus respectively.

== Early life, family, and personal life ==
Spence was the second son to Ninian Spence and his wife Sarah Townsend. Ninian Spence ran a coppersmith business, and the Spence family were a prominent family in Greenock at the time.

From an early age, Spence was characterised as having a docile and reasonable nature, with him being mature for his age. At school he formed a life-long friendship with John Galt, who documented much of his life and his works posthumously. Despite having received a formal education until he was a teenager, Spence never attended university, instead he moved to Glasgow where he lodged with a friend of his fathers, learning the skills of a manufacturer.

Two years after his father's death in 1795, Spence returned to Greenock in 1797. With the support of Galt and others, he established a small literary society, wherein once a month they read a range of essays on varying subjects, this society met frequently until 1804. After this, Spence visited many places in England, he lived in London for a few months where, in 1809, he published his first work. In 1814, he published his second work, getting married in the same year – Spence intended to live in London, and began his journey back before becoming ill, having travelled as far as Glasgow, he died in his sleep due to illness.

Spence held an interest in musical composition, and played the flute.

== Published works ==
Spence published An Essay on the Theory of the Various Orders of Logarithmic Transcendents: With an Inquiry Into Their Applications to the Integral Calculus and the Summation of Series in 1809. Throughout his work, he displayed a familiarity with the work of Lagrange and Arbogast, which is notable since at the time very few were familiar with their works. In his preface he derived the binomial theorem and mainly focused on the properties and analytic applications of the series:

$$\pm x/1^n - x^2/2^n \pm x^3/3^n - ...$$

which he denoted with $L_n(1\pm x)$. He went on further to derive nine general properties of this function in a table.

Spence goes on to calculate the values of:

$$L_2(x) = -\int^x_0\frac{\ln (1-t)}{t} \operatorname{d}\!t$$

(the dilogarithm) to nine decimal places, in a table, for all integer values of $1 + x$ from 1 to 100, the first ever of its kind. These functions became known as the polylogarithm functions, with this particular case often called Spence's function after Spence.

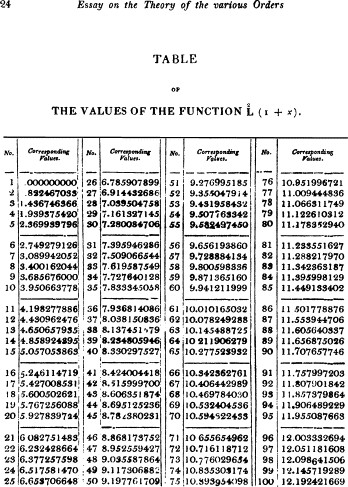
Spence's numerical calculation of the dilogarithm from (Spence, 1809, p. 24)

Later on he also created a similar table for $\tan^{-1}x$.

Spence published his last work, Outlines of a theory of Algebraical Equations, deduced from the principles of Harriott, and extended to the fluxional or differential calculus was published in 1814. In which he took a systematic approach to solving equations up to the fourth degree using symmetrical functions of the roots.

After Spence's death, John Herschel edited Mathematical Essays by the late William Spence, which was published in 1819, with John Galt writing a biography on Spence.

== Legacy ==
Spence's work was noted to be remarkable at the time, with John Herschel, his acquaintance and one of Britain's leading mathematicians at the time, had referenced it in one of his later publications Consideration of various points of analysis, which prompted Herschel to edit Spence's manuscripts. Spence was held in such high regard by Galt, and later Herschel that they published a collection of his individual essays in 1819. Posthumously, his work was met with appreciation from his contemporaries, with a review in the ninety-fourth number of the Quarterly Review (reproduced in Galt's The Literary and Miscellanies of John Galt, Volume 1) that described his first work in 1809 as:

" [The] first formal essay in our language on any distinct and considerable branch of the integral calculus, which has appeared since… Hellinsʼs papers on the ‘Rectification of the Conic Sections".
