= Harold Exton =

English mathematician

Harold Exton is a mathematician at University of Central Lancashire (called Preston Polytechnic while he was there) working on hypergeometric functions, who introduced the Hahn–Exton q-Bessel function.
