= Normal-exponential-gamma distribution =

Theory in statistics

Normal-Exponential-Gamma
- Parameters: μ ∈ R — mean (location) $k > 0$ shape $\theta > 0$ scale
- Support: $x \in (-\infty, \infty)$
- PDF: $\propto \exp{\left(\frac{(x-\mu)^2}{4\theta^2}\right)}D_{-2k-1}\left(\frac{|x-\mu|}{\theta}\right)$
- Mean: $\mu$
- Median: $\mu$
- Mode: $\mu$
- Variance: $\frac{\theta^2}{k-1}$ for $k>1$
- Skewness: 0

In probability theory and statistics, the normal-exponential-gamma distribution (sometimes called the NEG distribution) is a three-parameter family of continuous probability distributions. It has a location parameter $\mu$, scale parameter $\theta$ and a shape parameter $k$ .

== Probability density function ==
The probability density function (pdf) of the normal-exponential-gamma distribution is proportional to

$$f(x;\mu, k,\theta) \propto \exp{\left(\frac{(x-\mu)^2}{4\theta^2}\right)}D_{-2k-1}\left(\frac{|x-\mu|}{\theta}\right)$$,

where D is a parabolic cylinder function.

As for the Laplace distribution, the pdf of the NEG distribution can be expressed as a mixture of normal distributions,

$$f(x;\mu, k,\theta)=\int_0^\infty\int_0^\infty\ \mathrm{N}(x| \mu, \sigma^2)\mathrm{Exp}(\sigma^2|\psi)\mathrm{Gamma}(\psi|k, 1/\theta^2) \, d\sigma^2 \, d\psi,$$

where, in this notation, the distribution-names should be interpreted as meaning the density functions of those distributions.

Within this scale mixture, the scale's mixing distribution (an exponential with a gamma-distributed rate) actually is a Lomax distribution.

== Applications ==
The distribution has heavy tails and a sharp peak at $\mu$ and, because of this, it has applications in variable selection.

== See also ==
- Compound probability distribution
- Lomax distribution
