= F. H. Jackson =

British mathematician

The Reverend Frank Hilton Jackson (16 August 1870 in Hull, England – 27 April 1960) was an English clergyman and mathematician who worked on basic hypergeometric series. He introduced several q-analogs such as the Jackson–Bessel functions, the Jackson-Hahn-Cigler q-addition, the Jackson derivative, and the Jackson integral.

== Selected papers ==
- Jackson, F. H. (1917). The $q$-integral analogous to Borel's integral. Messenger Math, 47, 57–64.
- Jackson, F. H. (1921). Summation of $q$-hypergeometric series. Messenger of Math, 57, 101–112.
- Jackson, F. H. (1928). Examples of a generalization of Euler's transformation for power series. Messenger Math, 57, 169–187.
- Jackson, F. H. (1940). The $q^\theta$ equations whose solutions are products of solutions of $q^\theta$ equations of lower order. The Quarterly Journal of Mathematics, (1), 1–17.
- Jackson, F. H. (1941). Certain $q$-identities. The Quarterly Journal of Mathematics, (1), 167–172.
- Jackson, F. H. (1942). On basic double hypergeometric functions. The Quarterly Journal of Mathematics, (1), 69–82.
- Jackson, F. H. (1944). Basic double hypergeometric functions (II). The Quarterly Journal of Mathematics, (1), 49–61.
