= Hahn–Exton q-Bessel function =

In mathematics, the Hahn–Exton q-Bessel function or the third Jackson q-Bessel function is a q-analog of the Bessel function, and satisfies the Hahn-Exton q-difference equation (Swarttouw (1992)). This function was introduced by Hahn (1953) in a special case and by Exton (1983) in general.

The Hahn–Exton q-Bessel function is given by

$$J_\nu^{(3)}(x;q) = \frac{x^\nu(q^{\nu+1};q)_\infty}{(q;q)_\infty} \sum_{k\ge 0}\frac{(-1)^kq^{k(k+1)/2}x^{2k}}{(q^{\nu+1};q)_k(q;q)_k}= \frac{(q^{\nu+1};q)_\infty}{(q;q)_\infty} x^\nu {}_1\phi_1(0;q^{\nu+1};q,qx^2).$$

$\phi$ is the basic hypergeometric function.

== Properties ==
=== Zeros ===
Koelink and Swarttouw proved that $J_\nu^{(3)}(x;q)$ has infinite number of real zeros. They also proved that for $\nu>-1$ all non-zero roots of $J_\nu^{(3)}(x;q)$ are real (Koelink and Swarttouw (1994)). For more details, see Abreu, Bustoz & Cardoso (2003). Zeros of the Hahn-Exton q-Bessel function appear in a discrete analog of Daniel Bernoulli's problem about free vibrations of a lump loaded chain (Hahn (1953), Exton (1983))

=== Derivatives ===
For the (usual) derivative and q-derivative of $J_\nu^{(3)}(x;q)$, see Koelink and Swarttouw (1994). The symmetric q-derivative of $J_\nu^{(3)}(x;q)$ is described on Cardoso (2016).

=== Recurrence Relation ===
The Hahn–Exton q-Bessel function has the following recurrence relation (see Swarttouw (1992)):

$$J_{\nu+1}^{(3)}(x;q)=\left(\frac{1-q^\nu}{x}+x\right)J_\nu^{(3)}(x;q)-J_{\nu-1}^{(3)}(x;q).$$

== Alternative Representations ==
=== Integral Representation ===
The Hahn–Exton q-Bessel function has the following integral representation (see Ismail and Zhang (2018)):

$$J_{\nu}^{(3)}(z;q)=\frac{z^\nu}{\sqrt{\pi\log q^{-2}}}\int_{-\infty}^{\infty}\frac{\exp\left(\frac{x^2}{\log q^2}\right)}{(q,-q^{\nu+1/2}e^{ix},-q^{1/2}z^2e^{ix};q)_{\infty}}\,dx.$$
$$(a_1,a_2,\cdots,a_n;q)_{\infty}:=(a_1;q)_{\infty}(a_2;q)_{\infty}\cdots(a_n;q)_{\infty}.$$

=== Hypergeometric Representation ===
The Hahn–Exton q-Bessel function has the following hypergeometric representation (see Daalhuis (1994)):

$$J_{\nu}^{(3)}(x;q)=x^{\nu}\frac{(x^2 q;q)_{\infty}}{(q;q)_{\infty}}\ _1\phi_1(0;x^2 q;q,q^{\nu+1}).$$

This converges fast at $x\to\infty$. It is also an asymptotic expansion for $\nu\to\infty$.
