= Q-Gaussian process =

q-Gaussian processes are deformations of the usual Gaussian distribution. There are several different versions of this; here we treat a multivariate deformation, also addressed as q-Gaussian process, arising from free probability theory and corresponding to deformations of the canonical commutation relations. For other deformations of Gaussian distributions, see q-Gaussian distribution and Gaussian q-distribution.

== History ==
The q-Gaussian process was formally introduced in a paper by Frisch and Bourret under the name of parastochastics, and also later by Greenberg as an example of infinite statistics. It was mathematically established and investigated in papers by Bozejko and Speicher and by Bozejko, Kümmerer, and Speicher in the context of non-commutative probability.

It is given as the distribution of sums of creation and annihilation operators in a q-deformed Fock space. The calculation of moments of those operators is given by a q-deformed version of a Wick formula or Isserlis formula. The specification of a special covariance in the underlying Hilbert space leads to the q-Brownian motion, a special non-commutative version of classical Brownian motion.

== q-Fock space ==
In the following $q\in[-1,1]$ is fixed. Consider a Hilbert space $\mathcal{H}$. On the algebraic full Fock space

$$\mathcal{F}_\text{alg}(\mathcal{H})=\bigoplus_{n\geq 0}\mathcal{H}^{\otimes n},$$

where $\mathcal{H}^0=\mathbb{C}\Omega$ with a norm one vector $\Omega$, called vacuum, we define a q-deformed inner product as follows:

$$\langle h_1\otimes\cdots\otimes h_n,g_1\otimes\cdots\otimes g_m\rangle_q = \delta_{nm}\sum_{\sigma\in S_n}\prod^n_{r=1}\langle h_r,g_{\sigma(r)}\rangle q^{i(\sigma)},$$

where $i(\sigma)=\#\{(k,\ell)\mid 1\leq k<\ell\leq n; \sigma(k)>\sigma(\ell)\}$ is the number of inversions of $\sigma\in S_n$.

The q-Fock space is then defined as the completion of the algebraic full Fock space with respect to this inner product

$$\mathcal{F}_q(\mathcal{H})=\overline{\bigoplus_{n\geq 0}\mathcal{H}^{\otimes n}}^{\langle\cdot,\cdot\rangle_q}.$$

For $-1 < q < 1$ the q-inner product is strictly positive. For $q=1$ and $q=-1$ it is positive, but has a kernel, which leads in these cases to the symmetric and anti-symmetric Fock spaces, respectively.

For $h\in\mathcal{H}$ we define the q-creation operator $a^*(h)$, given by

$$a^*(h)\Omega=h,\qquad
a^*(h)h_1\otimes\cdots\otimes h_n=h\otimes h_1\otimes\cdots\otimes h_n.$$

Its adjoint (with respect to the q-inner product), the q-annihilation operator $a(h)$, is given by

$$a(h)\Omega=0,\qquad
a(h)h_1\otimes\cdots\otimes h_n=\sum_{r=1}^n q^{r-1} \langle h,h_r\rangle h_1\otimes \cdots \otimes h_{r-1}\otimes h_{r+1}\otimes\cdots \otimes h_n.$$

== q-commutation relations ==
Those operators satisfy the q-commutation relations

$$a(f)a^*(g)-q a^*(g)a(f)=\langle f,g\rangle \cdot 1\qquad (f,g\in \mathcal{H}).$$

For $q=1$, $q=0$, and $q=-1$ this reduces to the CCR-relations, the Cuntz relations, and the CAR-relations, respectively. With the exception of the case $q=1,$ the operators $a^*(f)$ are bounded.

== q-Gaussian elements and definition of multivariate q-Gaussian distribution (q-Gaussian process) ==
Operators of the form $s_q(h)={a(h)+a^*(h)}$ for $h\in\mathcal{H}$ are called q-Gaussian (or q-semicircular) elements.

On $\mathcal{F}_q(\mathcal{H})$ we consider the vacuum expectation state $\tau(T)=\langle \Omega,T\Omega \rangle$, for $T\in\mathcal{B}(\mathcal{F}(\mathcal{H}))$.

The (multivariate) q-Gaussian distribution or q-Gaussian process is defined as the non commutative distribution of a collection of q-Gaussians with respect to the vacuum expectation state. For $h_1,\dots,h_p\in\mathcal{H}$ the joint distribution of $s_q(h_1),\dots,s_q(h_p)$ with respect to $\tau$ can be described in the following way,: for any $i\{1,\dots,k\}\rightarrow\{1,\dots,p\}$ we have

$$\tau\left(s_q(h_{i(1)})\cdots s_q(h_{i(k)})\right)=\sum_{\pi\in\mathcal{P}_2(k)} q^{cr(\pi)} \prod_{(r,s)\in\pi} \langle h_{i(r)}, h_{i(s)} \rangle,$$

where $cr(\pi)$ denotes the number of crossings of the pair-partition $\pi$. This is a q-deformed version of the Wick/Isserlis formula.

== q-Gaussian distribution in the one-dimensional case ==
For p = 1, the q-Gaussian distribution is a probability measure on the interval $[-2/\sqrt{1-q}, 2/\sqrt{1-q}]$, with analytic formulas for its density. For the special cases $q=1$, $q=0$, and $q=-1$, this reduces to the classical Gaussian distribution, the Wigner semicircle distribution, and the symmetric Bernoulli distribution on $\pm 1$. The determination of the density follows from old results on corresponding orthogonal polynomials.

== Operator algebraic questions ==
The von Neumann algebra generated by $s_q(h_i)$, for $h_i$ running through an orthonormal system $(h_i)_{i\in I}$ of vectors in $\mathcal{H}$, reduces for $q=0$ to the famous free group factors $L(F_{\vert I\vert})$. Understanding the structure of those von Neumann algebras for general q has been a source of many investigations. It is now known, by work of Guionnet and Shlyakhtenko, that at least for finite I and for small values of q, the von Neumann algebra is isomorphic to the corresponding free group factor.
