= Lomax distribution =

Heavy-tail probability distribution

Lomax
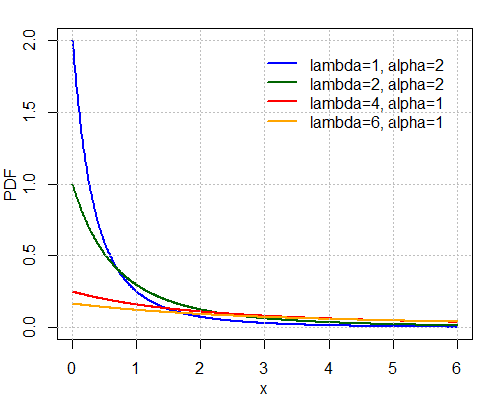
- Probability density function

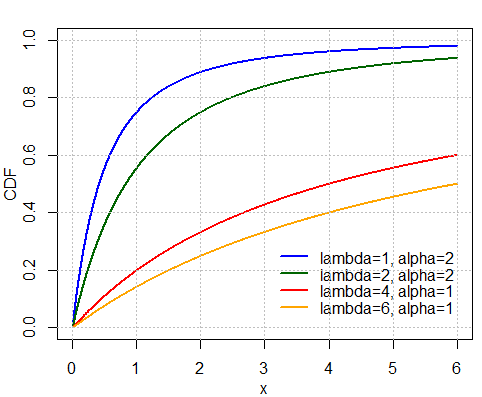
- Cumulative distribution function
- Parameters: $\alpha > 0$ shape (real); $\lambda >0$ scale (real)
- Support: $x \ge 0$
- PDF: ${\alpha \over \lambda} \left(1 + \frac x\lambda \right)^{-(\alpha+1)}$
- CDF: $1 - \left(1 + \frac x\lambda \right)^{-\alpha}$
- Quantile: $\lambda \left((1 - p)^{-1/\alpha} -1\right)$
- Mean: $\frac\lambda{\alpha -1} \text{ for } \alpha > 1$; undefined otherwise
- Median: $\lambda\left(\sqrt[\alpha]{2} - 1\right)$
- Mode: 0
- Variance: $$\begin{cases} \frac{\lambda^2 \alpha}{(\alpha-1)^2(\alpha-2)} & \alpha > 2 \\ \infty           & 1 < \alpha \le 2 \\ \text{undefined} & \text{otherwise} \end{cases}$$
- Skewness: $\frac{2(1+\alpha)}{\alpha-3}\,\sqrt{\frac{\alpha-2}{\alpha}}\text{ for }\alpha>3\,$
- Excess kurtosis: $\frac{6(\alpha^3+\alpha^2-6\alpha-2)}{\alpha(\alpha-3)(\alpha-4)}\text{ for }\alpha>4\,$
- Entropy: $1+\frac{1}{\alpha}-\log\frac{\alpha}{\lambda}$
- MGF: $\alpha e^{-\lambda t}(-\lambda t)^{\alpha}\Gamma(-\alpha, -\lambda t)\,$
- CF: $\alpha e^{-i \lambda t}(-i \lambda t)^{\alpha}\Gamma(-\alpha, -i \lambda t)\,$

The Lomax distribution, conditionally also called the Pareto Type II distribution, is a heavy-tail probability distribution used in business, economics, actuarial science, queueing theory and Internet traffic modeling. It is named after K. S. Lomax. It is essentially a Pareto distribution that has been shifted so that its support begins at zero.

== Characterization ==
=== Probability density function ===
The probability density function (pdf) for the Lomax distribution is given by

$$p(x) = \frac\alpha\lambda \left(1 + \frac x\lambda \right)^{-(\alpha+1)}, \qquad x \geq 0,$$

with shape parameter $\alpha > 0$ and scale parameter $\lambda > 0$. The density can be rewritten in such a way that more clearly shows the relation to the Pareto Type I distribution. That is:

$$p(x) = \frac{\alpha\lambda^\alpha}{(x + \lambda)^{\alpha+1}}.$$

=== Non-central moments ===
The $\nu$th non-central moment $E\left[X^\nu\right]$ exists only if the shape parameter $\alpha$ strictly exceeds $\nu$, when the moment has the value

$$E\left(X^\nu\right) = \frac{\lambda^\nu \Gamma(\alpha - \nu)\Gamma(1 + \nu)}{\Gamma(\alpha)}.$$

== Related distributions ==
=== Relation to the Pareto distribution ===
The Lomax distribution is a Pareto Type I distribution shifted so that its support begins at zero. Specifically:

$$\text{If } Y \sim \operatorname{Pareto}(x_m = \lambda, \alpha), \text{ then } Y - x_m \sim \operatorname{Lomax}(\alpha,\lambda).$$

The Lomax distribution is a Pareto Type II distribution with x_{m} = λ and μ = 0:

$$\text{If } X \sim \operatorname{Lomax}(\alpha, \lambda) \text{ then } X \sim \text{P(II)}\left(x_m = \lambda, \alpha, \mu = 0\right).$$

=== Relation to the generalized Pareto distribution ===
The Lomax distribution is a special case of the generalized Pareto distribution. Specifically:

$$\mu = 0,~ \xi = {1 \over \alpha},~ \sigma = {\lambda \over \alpha} .$$

=== Relation to the beta prime distribution ===
The Lomax distribution with scale parameter λ = 1 is a special case of the beta prime distribution. If X has a Lomax distribution, then $\frac{X}{\lambda} \sim \beta^\prime(1, \alpha)$.

=== Relation to the F distribution ===
The Lomax distribution with shape parameter α = 1 and scale parameter λ = 1 has density $f(x) = \frac{1}{(1 + x)^2}$, the same distribution as an F(2,2) distribution. This is the distribution of the ratio of two independent and identically distributed random variables with exponential distributions.

=== Relation to the q-exponential distribution ===
The Lomax distribution is a special case of the q-exponential distribution. The q-exponential extends this distribution to support on a bounded interval. The Lomax parameters are given by:

$$\alpha = {{2 - q} \over {q - 1}}, ~ \lambda = {1 \over \lambda_q(q - 1)} .$$

=== Relation to the logistic distribution ===
The logarithm of a Lomax(shape = 1.0, scale = λ)-distributed variable follows a logistic distribution with location log(λ) and scale 1.0.

=== Gamma-exponential (scale-) mixture connection ===
The Lomax distribution arises as a mixture of exponential distributions where the mixing distribution of the rate is a gamma distribution. If λ | k,θ ~ Gamma(shape = k, scale = θ) and X | λ ~ Exponential(rate = λ) then the marginal distribution of X | k,θ is Lomax(shape = k, scale = 1/θ). Since the rate parameter may equivalently be reparameterized to a scale parameter, the Lomax distribution constitutes a scale mixture of exponentials (with the exponential scale parameter following an inverse-gamma distribution).

=== Relation to the gamma distribution ===
Let $X \sim \operatorname{Exp}(1)$ and $Y \sim \operatorname{Gamma}(\alpha,1)$, then $X/Y \sim \operatorname{Lomax}(\alpha,1).$

== See also ==
- Power law
- Compound probability distribution
- Hyperexponential distribution (finite mixture of exponentials)
- Normal-exponential-gamma distribution (a normal scale mixture with Lomax mixing distribution)
