= Q-Gaussian distribution =

Generalization of Gaussian distribution

q-Gaussian
- Probability density function
- Parameters: $q < 3$ shape (real) $\beta > 0$ (real)
- Support: $x \in (-\infty; +\infty)\!$ for $1\le q < 3$ $x \in \left[\pm {1 \over \sqrt{\beta(1-q)}}\right]$ for $q < 1$
- PDF: ${\sqrt{\beta} \over C_q} e_q({-\beta x^2})$
- CDF: see text
- Mean: $0\text{ for }q<2$, otherwise undefined
- Median: $0$
- Mode: $0$
- Variance: ${ 1 \over {\beta (5-3q)}} \text{ for } q < {5 \over 3}$ $\infty \text{ for } {5 \over 3} \le q < 2$ $\text{Undefined for }2 \le q <3$
- Skewness: $0 \text{ for } q < {3 \over 2}$
- Excess kurtosis: $6{q-1 \over 7-5q} \text{ for } q < {7 \over 5}$

The q-Gaussian is a probability distribution arising from the maximization of the Tsallis entropy under appropriate constraints. It is one example of a Tsallis distribution. The q-Gaussian is a generalization of the Gaussian in the same way that Tsallis entropy is a generalization of standard Boltzmann–Gibbs entropy or Shannon entropy. The normal distribution is recovered as q → 1.

The q-Gaussian has been applied to problems in the fields of statistical mechanics, geology, anatomy, astronomy, economics, finance, and machine learning. The distribution is often favored for its heavy tails in comparison to the Gaussian for 1 < q < 3. For $q <1$ the q-Gaussian distribution is the PDF of a bounded random variable. This makes in biology and other domains the q-Gaussian distribution more suitable than Gaussian distribution to model the effect of external stochasticity. A generalized q-analog of the classical central limit theorem was proposed in 2008, in which the independence constraint for the i.i.d. variables is relaxed to an extent defined by the q parameter, with independence being recovered as q → 1. However, a proof of such a theorem is still lacking.

In the heavy tail regions, the distribution is equivalent to the Student's t-distribution with a direct mapping between q and the degrees of freedom. A practitioner using one of these distributions can therefore parameterize the same distribution in two different ways. The choice of the q-Gaussian form may arise if the system is non-extensive, or if there is lack of a connection to small samples sizes.

== Characterization ==
=== Probability density function ===
The standard q-Gaussian has the probability density function

$$f(x) = {\sqrt{\beta} \over C_q} e_q(-\beta x^2)$$

where

$$e_q(x) = [1+(1-q)x]_+^{1 \over 1-q}$$

is the q-exponential and the normalization factor $C_q$ is given by

$$C_q = {{2 \sqrt{\pi} \Gamma\left({1 \over 1-q}\right)} \over {(3-q) \sqrt{1-q} \Gamma\left({3-q \over 2(1-q)}\right)}} \text{ for } -\infty < q < 1$$

$$C_q = \sqrt{\pi} \text{ for } q = 1 \,$$

$$C_q = { {\sqrt{\pi} \Gamma\left({3-q \over 2(q-1)}\right)} \over {\sqrt{q-1} \Gamma\left({1 \over q-1}\right)}} \text{ for }1 < q < 3 .$$

Note that for $q <1$ the q-Gaussian distribution is the PDF of a bounded random variable.

=== Cumulative density function ===
For $1 < q < 3$ cumulative density function is

$$F(x)= \frac{1}{2} + \frac{\sqrt{q-1}\, \Gamma\left({1 \over q-1}\right) x \sqrt{\beta} \, {}_2F_1\left (\tfrac{1}{2},\tfrac{1}{q-1};\tfrac{3}{2};-(q-1)\beta x^2 \right)}{\sqrt{\pi}\, \Gamma\left({3-q \over 2(q-1)}\right)} ,$$

where ${}_2F_1(a,b;c;z)$ is the hypergeometric function. As the hypergeometric function is defined for |z| < 1 but x is unbounded, Pfaff transformation could be used.

For $q<1$,
$$F(x)=
\begin{cases}
0 & x < - \frac{1}{\sqrt{\beta(1-q)}}, \\
\frac{1}{2} + \frac{\sqrt{1-q}\, \Gamma\left({5-3q \over 2(1-q)}\right) x \sqrt{\beta} \, {}_2F_1\left (\tfrac{1}{2},\tfrac{1}{q-1};\tfrac{3}{2};-(q-1)\beta x^2 \right)}{\sqrt{\pi}\, \Gamma\left({2-q \over 1-q}\right)} & - \frac{1}{\sqrt{\beta(1-q)}} < x < \frac{1}{\sqrt{\beta(1-q)}}, \\
1 & x > \frac{1}{\sqrt{\beta(1-q)}}.
\end{cases}$$

== Entropy ==
Just as the normal distribution is the maximum information entropy distribution for fixed values of the first moment $\operatorname{E}(X)$ and second moment $\operatorname{E}(X^2)$ (with the fixed zeroth moment $\operatorname{E}(X^0)=1$ corresponding to the normalization condition), the q-Gaussian distribution is the maximum Tsallis entropy distribution for fixed values of these three moments.

== Related distributions ==
=== Student's t-distribution ===
While it can be justified by an interesting alternative form of entropy, statistically it is a scaled reparametrization of the Student's t-distribution introduced by W. Gosset in 1908 to describe small-sample statistics. In Gosset's original presentation the degrees of freedom parameter ν was constrained to be a positive integer related to the sample size, but it is readily observed that Gosset's density function is valid for all real values of ν. The scaled reparametrization introduces the alternative parameters q and β which are related to ν.

Given a Student's t-distribution with ν degrees of freedom, the equivalent q-Gaussian has

$$q = \frac{\nu+3}{\nu+1}\text{ with }\beta = \frac{1}{3-q}$$

with inverse

$$\nu = \frac{3-q}{q-1},\text{ but only if }\beta = \frac{1}{3-q}.$$

Whenever $\beta \ne {1 \over {3-q}}$, the function is simply a scaled version of Student's t-distribution.

It is sometimes argued that the distribution is a generalization of Student's t-distribution to negative and or non-integer degrees of freedom. However, the theory of Student's t-distribution extends trivially to all real degrees of freedom, where the support of the distribution is now compact rather than infinite in the case of ν < 0.

=== Three-parameter version ===
As with many distributions centered on zero, the q-Gaussian can be trivially extended to include a location parameter μ. The density then becomes defined by

$${\sqrt{\beta} \over C_q} e_q({-\beta (x-\mu)^2}) .$$

== Generating random deviates ==
The Box–Muller transform has been generalized to allow random sampling from q-Gaussians. The standard Box–Muller technique generates pairs of independent normally distributed variables from equations of the following form.

$$Z_1 = \sqrt{-2 \ln(U_1)} \cos(2 \pi U_2)$$
$$Z_2 = \sqrt{-2 \ln(U_1)} \sin(2 \pi U_2)$$

The generalized Box–Muller technique can generates pairs of q-Gaussian deviates that are not independent. In practice, only a single deviate will be generated from a pair of uniformly distributed variables. The following formula will generate deviates from a q-Gaussian with specified parameter q and $\beta = {1 \over {3-q}}$

$$Z = \sqrt{-2 \text{ ln}_{q'}(U_1)} \text{ cos}(2 \pi U_2)$$

where $\text{ ln}_q$ is the q-logarithm and $q' = { {1+q} \over {3-q}}$

These deviates can be transformed to generate deviates from an arbitrary q-Gaussian by

$$Z' = \mu + {Z \over \sqrt{\beta (3-q)}}$$

== Applications ==
=== Physics ===
It has been shown that the momentum distribution of cold atoms in dissipative optical lattices is a q-Gaussian.

The q-Gaussian distribution is also obtained as the asymptotic probability density function of the position of the unidimensional motion of a mass subject to two forces: a deterministic force of the type $F_1(x) = - 2 x/(1-x^2)$ (determining an infinite potential well) and a stochastic white noise force $F_2(t)= \sqrt{2(1-q)} \xi(t)$, where $\xi(t)$ is a white noise. Note that in the overdamped/small mass approximation the above-mentioned convergence fails for $q <0$, as recently shown.

=== Finance ===
Financial return distributions in the New York Stock Exchange, NASDAQ and elsewhere have been interpreted as q-Gaussians.

== See also ==
- Constantino Tsallis
- Tsallis statistics
- Tsallis entropy
- Tsallis distribution
- q-exponential distribution
- Q-Gaussian process
- κ-Gaussian distribution
- generalized Gaussian distribution
