= Dilogarithm =

Special case of the polylogarithm

The dilogarithm along the real axis

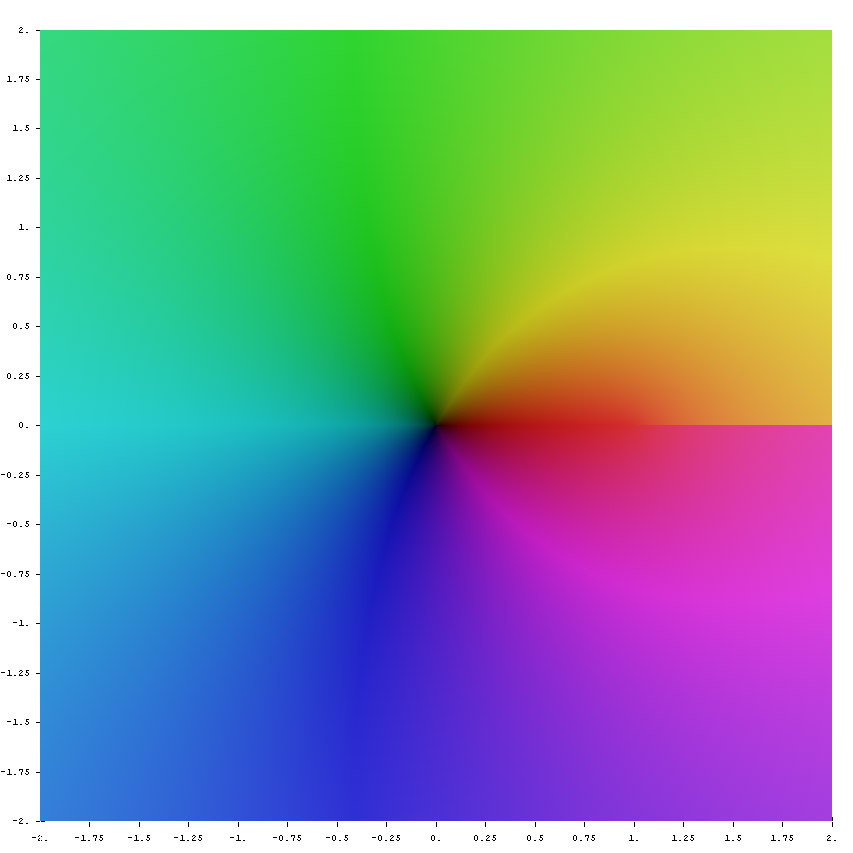
The principal value of the dilogarithm plotted in the complex plane

In mathematics, the dilogarithm (or Spence's function), denoted as Li_{2}(z), is a particular case of the polylogarithm. Two related special functions are referred to as Spence's function, the dilogarithm itself:

$$\operatorname{Li}_2(z) = -\int_0^z{\ln(1-u) \over u}\, du \text{, }z \in \Complex$$

and its reflection. For |z| ≤ 1, an infinite series also applies (the integral definition constitutes its analytical extension to the complex plane):

$$\operatorname{Li}_2(z) = \sum_{k=1}^\infty {z^k \over k^2}.$$

Alternatively, the dilogarithm function is sometimes defined as

$$\int_{1}^{v} \frac{ \ln t }{ 1 -t } dt = \operatorname{Li}_2(1-v).$$

In hyperbolic geometry the dilogarithm can be used to compute the volume of an ideal simplex. Specifically, a simplex whose vertices have cross ratio z has hyperbolic volume

$$D(z) = \operatorname{Im} \operatorname{Li}_2(z) + \arg(1-z) \log|z|.$$

The function D(z) is sometimes called the Bloch-Wigner function. Lobachevsky's function and Clausen's function are closely related functions.

William Spence, after whom the function was named by early writers in the field, was a Scottish mathematician working in the early nineteenth century. He was at school with John Galt, who later wrote a biographical essay on Spence.

== Analytic structure ==
Using the former definition above, the dilogarithm function is analytic everywhere on the complex plane except at $z = 1$, where it has a logarithmic branch point. The standard choice of branch cut is along the positive real axis $(1, \infty)$. However, the function is continuous at the branch point and takes on the value $\operatorname{Li}_2(1) = \pi^2/6$.

== Identities ==
$\operatorname{Li}_2(z)+\operatorname{Li}_2(-z)=\frac{1}{2}\operatorname{Li}_2(z^2).$
$\operatorname{Li}_2(1-z)+\operatorname{Li}_2\left(1-\frac{1}{z}\right)=-\frac{(\ln z)^2}{2}.$
$\operatorname{Li}_2(z)+\operatorname{Li}_2(1-z)=\frac{{\pi}^2}{6}-\ln z \cdot\ln(1-z).$ The reflection formula.
$\operatorname{Li}_2(-z)-\operatorname{Li}_2(1-z)+\frac{1}{2}\operatorname{Li}_2(1-z^2)=-\frac{{\pi}^2}{12}-\ln z \cdot \ln(z+1).$
$\operatorname{Li}_2(z) +\operatorname{Li}_2\left(\frac{1}{z}\right) = - \frac{\pi^2}{6} - \frac{(\ln(-z))^2}{2}.$
$\operatorname{L}(x)+\operatorname{L}(y)=\operatorname{L}(xy)+\operatorname{L}\left(\frac{x(1-y)}{1-xy}\right)+\operatorname{L}\left(\frac{y(1-x)}{1-xy}\right)$. Abel's functional equation or five-term relation where $\operatorname{L}(z)=\frac{\pi^2}{6}[\operatorname{Li}_2(z)+\frac12\ln(z)\ln(1-z)]$ is the Rogers L-function (an analogous relation is satisfied also by the quantum dilogarithm)

== Particular value identities ==
$\operatorname{Li}_2\left(\frac{1}{3}\right)-\frac{1}{6}\operatorname{Li}_2\left(\frac{1}{9}\right)=\frac{{\pi}^2}{18}-\frac{(\ln 3)^2}{6}.$
$\operatorname{Li}_2\left(-\frac{1}{3}\right)-\frac{1}{3}\operatorname{Li}_2\left(\frac{1}{9}\right)=-\frac{{\pi}^2}{18}+\frac{(\ln 3)^2}{6}.$
$\operatorname{Li}_2\left(-\frac{1}{2}\right)+\frac{1}{6}\operatorname{Li}_2\left(\frac{1}{9}\right)=-\frac{{\pi}^2}{18}+\ln2\cdot \ln3-\frac{(\ln 2)^2}{2}-\frac{(\ln 3)^2}{3}.$
$\operatorname{Li}_2\left(\frac{1}{4}\right)+\frac{1}{3}\operatorname{Li}_2\left(\frac{1}{9}\right)=\frac{{\pi}^2}{18}+2\ln2\cdot\ln3-2(\ln 2)^2-\frac{2}{3}(\ln 3)^2.$
$\operatorname{Li}_2\left(-\frac{1}{8}\right)+\operatorname{Li}_2\left(\frac{1}{9}\right)=-\frac{1}{2}\left(\ln{\frac{9}{8}}\right)^2.$
$$36\operatorname{Li}_2\left(\frac{1}{2}\right)-36\operatorname{Li}_2\left(\frac{1}{4}\right)-12\operatorname{Li}_2\left(\frac{1}{8}\right)+6\operatorname{Li}_2\left(\frac{1}{64}\right)={\pi}^2.$$

== Special values ==
$$\operatorname{Li}_2(-1)=-\frac{{\pi}^2}{12}.$$
$\operatorname{Li}_2(0)=0.$ Its slope = 1.
$$\operatorname{Li}_2\left(\frac{1}{2}\right)=\frac{{\pi}^2}{12}-\frac{(\ln 2)^2}{2}.$$
$\operatorname{Li}_2(1) = \zeta(2) = \frac{{\pi}^2}{6},$ where $\zeta(s)$ is the Riemann zeta function.
$$\operatorname{Li}_2(2)=\frac{{\pi}^2}{4}-i\pi\ln2.$$
$$\begin{align}
\operatorname{Li}_2\left(-\frac{\sqrt5-1}{2}\right)
&=-\frac{{\pi}^2}{15}+\frac{1}{2}\left(\ln\frac{\sqrt5+1}{2}\right)^2 \\
&=-\frac{{\pi}^2}{15}+\frac{1}{2}\operatorname{arcsch}^2 2.
\end{align}$$
$$\begin{align}
\operatorname{Li}_2\left(-\frac{\sqrt5+1}{2}\right)
&=-\frac{{\pi}^2}{10}-\ln^2 \frac{\sqrt5+1}{2} \\
&=-\frac{{\pi}^2}{10}-\operatorname{arcsch}^2 2.
\end{align}$$
$$\begin{align}
\operatorname{Li}_2\left(\frac{3-\sqrt5}{2}\right)
&=\frac{{\pi}^2}{15}-\ln^2 \frac{\sqrt5+1}{2} \\
&=\frac{{\pi}^2}{15}-\operatorname{arcsch}^2 2.
\end{align}$$
$$\begin{align}
\operatorname{Li}_2\left(\frac{\sqrt5-1}{2}\right)
&=\frac{{\pi}^2}{10}-\ln^2 \frac{\sqrt5+1}{2} \\
&=\frac{{\pi}^2}{10}-\operatorname{arcsch}^2 2.
\end{align}$$

== In particle physics ==
Spence's Function is commonly encountered in particle physics while calculating radiative corrections. In this context, the function is often defined with an absolute value inside the logarithm:

$$\operatorname{\Phi}(x) = -\int_0^x \frac{\ln|1-u|}{u} \, du =
\begin{cases}
\operatorname{Li}_2(x), & x \leq 1; \\ \frac{\pi^2}{3} - \frac{1}{2}(\ln x)^2 - \operatorname{Li}_2(\frac{1}{x}), & x > 1.
\end{cases}$$

== See also ==
- Markstein number
