= Q-exponential =

Q-analog in combinatorial mathematics

The term q-exponential occurs in two contexts. The q-exponential distribution, based on the Tsallis q-exponential is discussed in elsewhere.

In combinatorial mathematics, a q-exponential is a q-analog of the exponential function, namely the eigenfunction of a q-derivative. There are many q-derivatives, for example, the classical q-derivative, the Askey–Wilson operator, etc. Therefore, unlike the classical exponentials, q-exponentials are not unique. For example, $e_q(z)$ is the q-exponential corresponding to the classical q-derivative while $\mathcal{E}_q(z)$ are eigenfunctions of the Askey–Wilson operators.

The q-exponential is also known as the quantum dilogarithm.

== Definition ==
The q-exponential $e_q(z)$ is defined as

$$e_q(z)=
\sum_{n=0}^\infty \frac{z^n}{[n]!_q} =
\sum_{n=0}^\infty \frac{z^n (1-q)^n}{(q;q)_n} =
\sum_{n=0}^\infty z^n\frac{(1-q)^n}{(1-q^n)(1-q^{n-1}) \cdots (1-q)}$$

where $[n]!_q$ is the q-factorial and

$$(q;q)_n=(1-q^n)(1-q^{n-1})\cdots (1-q)$$

is the q-Pochhammer symbol. That this is the q-analog of the exponential follows from the property

$$\left(\frac{d}{dz}\right)_q e_q(z) = e_q(z)$$

where the derivative on the left is the q-derivative. The above is easily verified by considering the q-derivative of the monomial

$$\left(\frac{d}{dz}\right)_q z^n = z^{n-1} \frac{1-q^n}{1-q}
=[n]_q z^{n-1}.$$

Here, $[n]_q$ is the q-bracket. For other definitions of the q-exponential function, see Exton (1983), Ismail & Zhang (1994), and Cieśliński (2011).

== Properties ==
For real $q>1$, the function $e_q(z)$ is an entire function of $z$. For $q<1$, $e_q(z)$ is regular in the disk $|z|<1/(1-q)$.

It is easy to prove that $~[e_q(z)]^q ~ e_{1/q} (-zq) =1$, for $z\neq\frac 1 {q-1}$ and $q \neq 1$.

=== Addition Formula ===
The analogue of $\exp(x)\exp(y)=\exp(x+y)$ does not hold for real numbers $x$ and $y$. However, if these are operators satisfying the commutation relation $xy=qyx$, then $e_q(x)e_q(y)=e_q(x+y)$ holds true.

== Relations ==
For $-1<q<1$, a function that is closely related is $E_q(z).$ It is a special case of the basic hypergeometric series,

$$E_{q}(z)=\;_{1}\phi_{1}\left({\scriptstyle{0\atop 0}}\, ;\,z\right)=\sum_{n=0}^{\infty}\frac{q^{\binom{n}{2}}(-z)^{n}}{(q;q)_{n}}=\prod_{n=0}^{\infty}(1-q^{n}z)=(z;q)_\infty.$$

Clearly,

$$\lim_{q\to1}E_{q}\left(z(1-q)\right)=\lim_{q\to1}\sum_{n=0}^{\infty}\frac{q^{\binom{n}{2}}(1-q)^{n}}{(q;q)_{n}}
(-z)^{n}=e^{-z} .~$$

=== Relation with Dilogarithm ===
$e_q(x)$ has the following infinite product representation:

$$e_q(x)=\left(\prod_{k=0}^\infty(1-q^k(1-q)x)\right)^{-1}.$$

On the other hand, $\log(1-x)=-\sum_{n=1}^\infty\frac{x^n}{n}$ holds. When $|q|<1$,

$$\begin{align}
\log e_q(x) &= -\sum_{k=0}^\infty\log(1-q^k(1-q)x) \\
&= \sum_{k=0}^\infty\sum_{n=1}^\infty\frac{(q^k(1-q)x)^n}{n} \\
&= \sum_{n=1}^\infty\frac{((1-q)x)^n}{(1-q^n)n} \\
&= \frac{1}{1-q}\sum_{n=1}^\infty\frac{((1-q)x)^n}{[n]_qn}
\end{align}.$$

By taking the limit $q\to 1$,

$$\lim_{q\to 1}(1-q)\log e_q(x/(1-q))=\mathrm{Li}_2(x),$$

where $\mathrm{Li}_2(x)$ is the dilogarithm.
