= Quantum dilogarithm =

In mathematics, the quantum dilogarithm is a special function defined by the formula

$$\phi(x)\equiv(x;q)_\infty=\prod_{n=0}^\infty (1-xq^n),\quad |q|<1$$

It is the same as the q-exponential function $e_q(x)$.

Let $u,v$ be "q-commuting variables", that is elements of a suitable noncommutative algebra satisfying Weyl's relation $uv=qvu$. Then, the quantum dilogarithm satisfies Schützenberger's identity

$$\phi(u) \phi(v)=\phi(u + v),$$

Faddeev-Volkov's identity

$$\phi(v) \phi(u)=\phi(u +v -vu),$$

and Faddeev-Kashaev's identity

$$\phi(v)\phi(u)=\phi(u)\phi(-vu)\phi(v).$$

The latter is known to be a quantum generalization of Rogers' five term dilogarithm identity.

Faddeev's quantum dilogarithm $\Phi_b(w)$ is defined by the following formula:

$$\Phi_b(z)=\exp
\left(
\frac{1}{4}\int_C
\frac{e^{-2i zw }}
{\sinh (wb) \sinh (w/b) }
\frac{dw}{w}
\right),$$

where the contour of integration $C$ goes along the real axis outside a small neighborhood of the origin and deviates into the upper half-plane near the origin. The same function can be described by the integral formula of Woronowicz:

$$\Phi_b(x)=\exp\left(\frac{i}{2\pi}\int_{\mathbb R}\frac{\log(1+e^{tb^2+2\pi b x})}{1+e^{t}}\,dt\right).$$

Ludvig Faddeev discovered the quantum pentagon identity:

$$\Phi_b(\hat p)\Phi_b(\hat q)
=
\Phi_b(\hat q)
\Phi_b(\hat p+ \hat q)
\Phi_b(\hat p),$$

where $\hat p$ and $\hat q$ are self-adjoint (normalized) quantum mechanical momentum and position operators satisfying Heisenberg's commutation relation

$$[\hat p,\hat q]=\frac1{2\pi i}$$

and the inversion relation

$$\Phi_b(x)\Phi_b(-x)=\Phi_b(0)^2 e^{\pi ix^2},\quad \Phi_b(0)=e^{\frac{\pi i}{24}\left(b^2+b^{-2}\right)}.$$

The quantum dilogarithm finds applications in mathematical physics, quantum topology, cluster algebra theory.

The precise relationship between the q-exponential and is expressed by the equality

$$\Phi_b(z)=\frac{E_{e^{2\pi ib^2}}(-e^{\pi ib^2+2\pi zb})}{E_{e^{-2\pi i/b^2}}(-e^{-\pi i/b^2+2\pi z/b})},$$

valid for $\operatorname{Im} b^2>0$.
