= Box–Cox distribution =

Probability distribution

In statistics, the Box–Cox distribution (also known as the power-normal distribution) is the distribution of a random variable X for which the Box–Cox transformation on X follows a truncated normal distribution. It is a continuous probability distribution having probability density function (pdf) given by

$$f(y) = \frac{1}{\left[1-I(f<0)-\sgn(f)\Phi(0,m,\sqrt{s})\right]\sqrt{2 \pi s^2}} \exp\left\{-\frac{1}{2s^2}\left(\frac{y^f}{f} - m\right)^2\right\}$$

for y > 0, where m is the location parameter of the distribution, s is the dispersion, ƒ is the family parameter, I is the indicator function, Φ is the cumulative distribution function of the standard normal distribution, and sgn is the sign function.

== Special cases ==
- ƒ = 1 gives a truncated normal distribution.
