= Wolfgang Hahn =

German mathematician

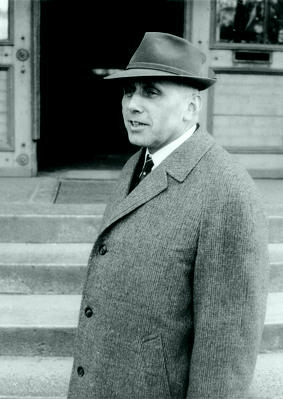
- Born: April 30, 1911; Potsdam, Germany
- Died: January 10, 1998 (aged 86); Kassel, Germany
- Education: University of Berlin
- Known for: Hahn polynomials, Hahn difference, Hahn ensemble, Hahn q-addition, Hahn–Exton q-Bessel function
- Scientific career
- Fields: Mathematics
- Workplaces: TU Braunschweig, TU Graz
- Doctoral advisor: Issai Schur

Wolfgang Hahn (April 30, 1911 – January 10, 1998) was a German mathematician who worked on special functions, in particular orthogonal polynomials.

He introduced Hahn polynomials, Hahn difference, Hahn q-addition (or Jackson-Hahn-Cigler q-addition), and the Hahn–Exton q-Bessel function. He was an honorary member of the Austrian Mathematical Society.
