= Jackson integral =

In q-analog theory, the Jackson integral or q-integral is a series in the theory of special functions that expresses the operation inverse to q-differentiation.

The Jackson integral was introduced by Frank Hilton Jackson. For methods of numerical evaluation, see and Exton (1983).

== Definition ==
Let f(x) be a function of a real variable x. For a a real variable, the Jackson integral of f is defined by the following series expansion:

$$\int_0^a f(x)\,{\rm d}_q x = (1-q)\,a\sum_{k=0}^{\infty}q^k f(q^k a).$$

Consistent with this is the definition for $a \to \infty$

$$\int_0^\infty f(x)\,{\rm d}_q x = (1-q)\sum_{k=-\infty}^{\infty}q^k f(q^k ).$$

More generally, if g(x) is another function and D_{q}g denotes its q-derivative, we can formally write

$\int f(x)\,D_q g\,{\rm d}_q x = (1-q)\,x\sum_{k=0}^{\infty}q^k f(q^k x)\,D_q g(q^k x) = (1-q)\,x\sum_{k=0}^{\infty}q^k f(q^k x)\tfrac{g(q^{k}x)-g(q^{k+1}x)}{(1-q)q^k x},$ or

$$\int f(x)\,{\rm d}_q g(x) = \sum_{k=0}^{\infty} f(q^k x)\cdot(g(q^{k}x)-g(q^{k+1}x)),$$

giving a q-analogue of the Riemann–Stieltjes integral.

== Jackson integral as q-antiderivative ==
Just as the ordinary antiderivative of a continuous function can be represented by its Riemann integral, it is possible to show that the Jackson integral gives a unique q-antiderivative within a certain class of functions (see).

=== Theorem ===
Suppose that $0<q<1.$ If $|f(x)x^\alpha|$ is bounded on the interval $[0,A)$ for some $0\leq\alpha<1,$ then the Jackson integral converges to a function $F(x)$ on $[0,A)$ which is a q-antiderivative of $f(x).$ Moreover, $F(x)$ is continuous at $x=0$ with $F(0)=0$ and is a unique antiderivative of $f(x)$ in this class of functions.
