= Constantino Tsallis =

Brazilian physicist of Greek descent

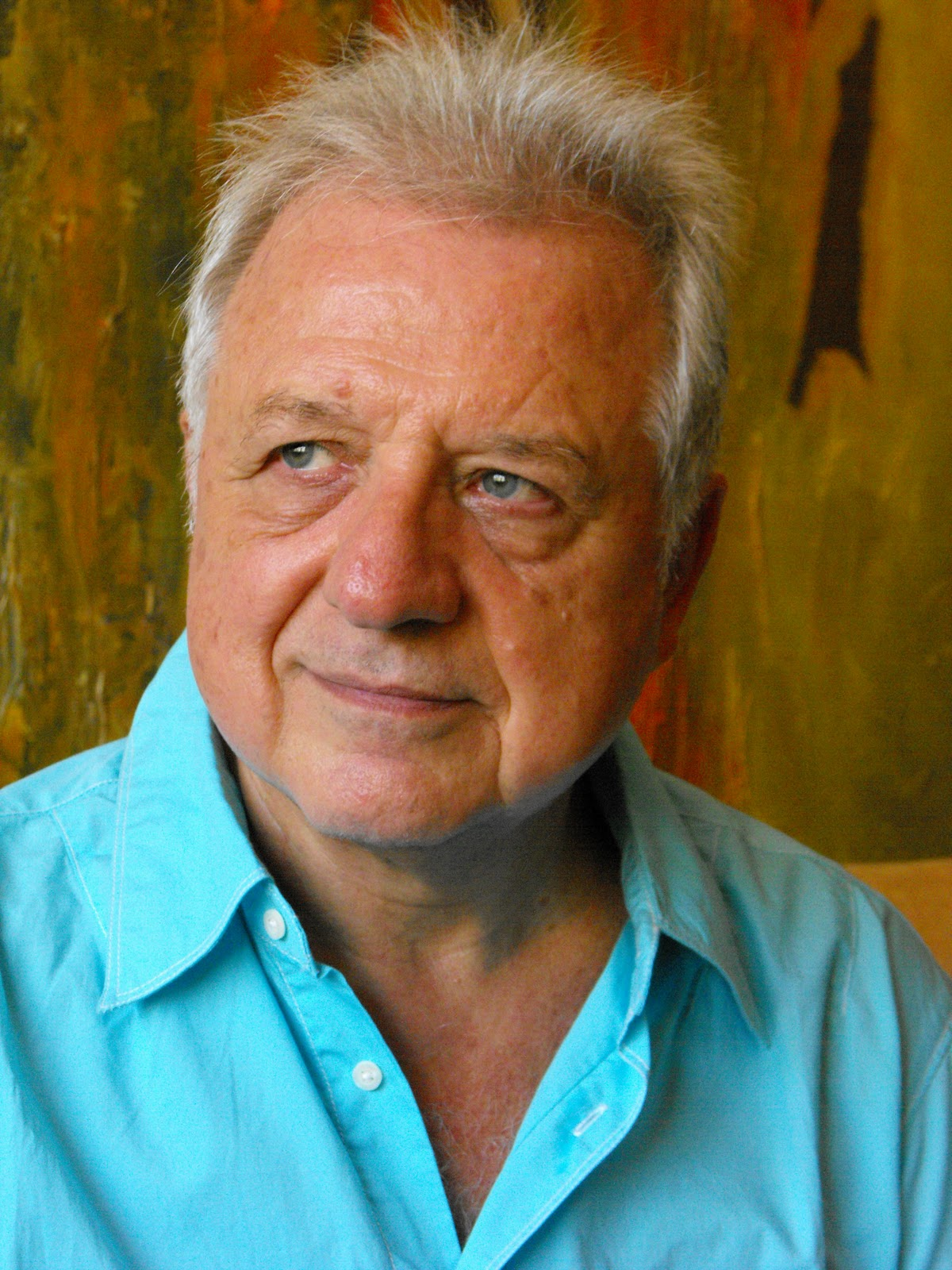
- Constantino Tsallis in 2010.
- Born: November 4, 1943 (age 82); Athens, Greece
- Citizenship: Brazilian
- Education: Balseiro Institute; Centro Brasileiro de Pesquisas Físicas; University of Paris-Sud
- Known for: Tsallis entropy Tsallis statistics Tsallis distribution
- Awards: Premio México de Ciencia y Tecnología (2003)
- Scientific career
- Fields: Theoretical physics
- Workplaces: Centro Brasileiro de Pesquisas Físicas (Brazilian Physics Research Center)
- Doctoral advisor: Guido Beck; André Guinier

Constantino Tsallis (/ˈsælɪs/; Greek: Κωνσταντίνος Τσάλλης [ˈtsalis]; born 4 November 1943) is a naturalized Brazilian physicist of Greek descent, working in Rio de Janeiro at Centro Brasileiro de Pesquisas Físicas (CBPF), Brazil. He is known for the development of Tsallis statistics used in non-equilibrium thermodynamics.

== Biography ==
Tsallis was born in Greece, and grew up in Argentina, where he studied physics at Instituto Balseiro, in Bariloche. In 1974, he received a Doctorat d'État ès Sciences Physiques degree from the University of Paris-Sud. He moved to Brazil in 1975 with his wife and daughter. Tsallis is an External Professor of the Santa Fe Institute.

== Research ==
Tsallis is credited with introducing the notion of what is known as Tsallis entropy and Tsallis statistics in his 1988 paper "Possible generalization of Boltzmann–Gibbs statistics" published in the Journal of Statistical Physics. The generalization is considered to be a good candidate for formulating a theory of non-extensive thermodynamics. The resulting theory is not intended to replace Boltzmann–Gibbs statistics, but rather supplement it, such as in the case of anomalous systems characterised by non-ergodicity or metastable states.

One experimental verification of the predictions of Tsallis statistics concerned cold atoms in dissipative optical lattices. Eric Lutz made an analytical prediction in 2003 which was verified in 2006 by a team in University College London.

Tsallis conjectured in 1999 (Brazilian Journal of Physics 29, 1;Figure 4):

1. That a longstanding quasi-stationary state (QSS) was expected in long-range interacting Hamiltonian systems (one of the core problems of statistical mechanics).
2. That this QSS should be described by Tsallis statistics instead of Boltzmann–Gibbs statistics. This was verified in June 2007 by A. Pluchino, A. Rapisarda and Tsallis (in the last figure, instead of the Maxwellian (Gaussian) distribution of velocities (valid for short-range interactions), one sees a q-Gaussian).
