= Back (crater) =

Crater on the Moon

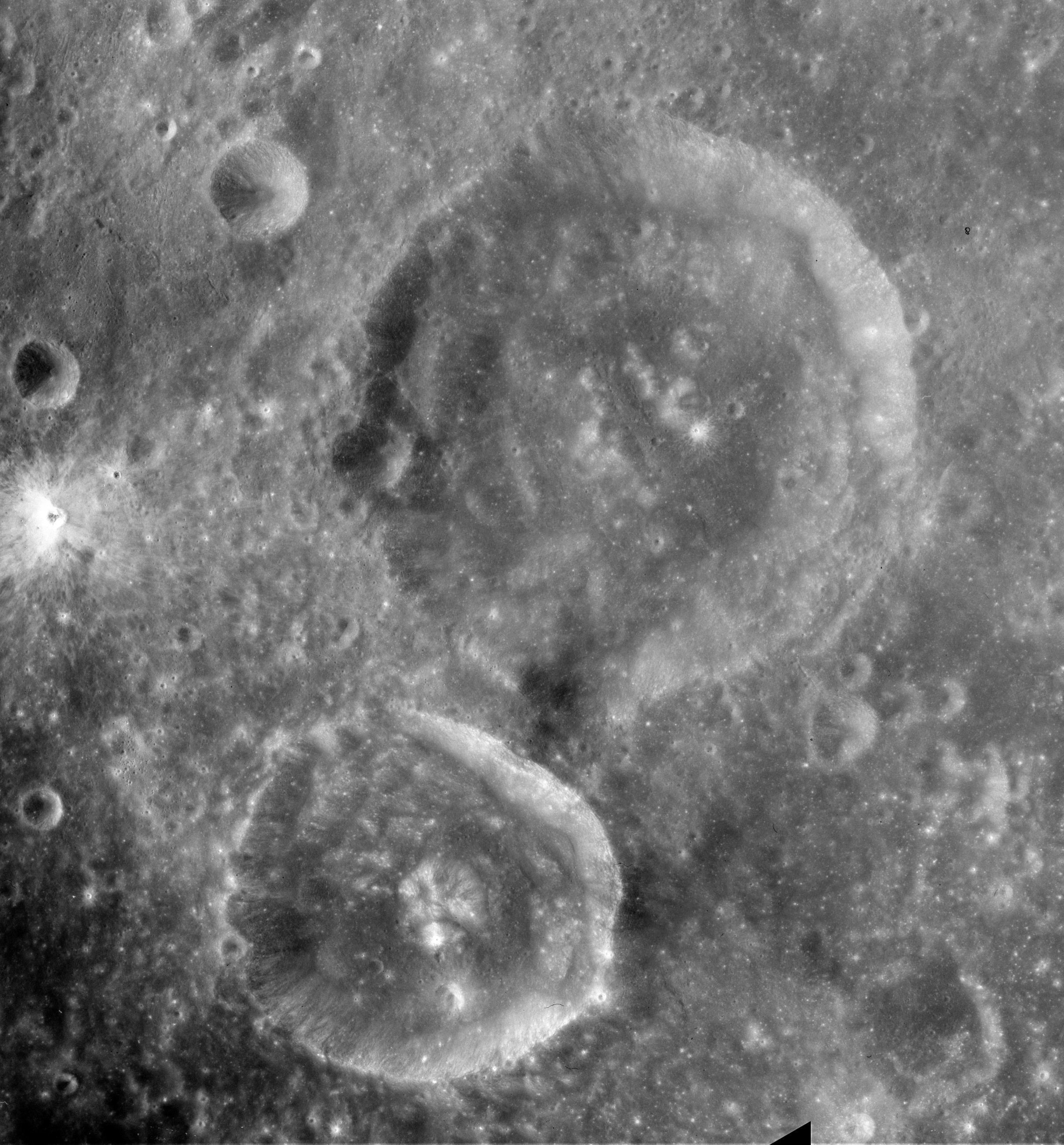
- Apollo 16 Mapping Camera image of Schubert crater (above right of center) and Back crater (below left of center)
- Coordinates: 1.1°N 80.7°E
- Diameter: 34.63 km (21.52 mi)
- Depth: Unknown
- Colongitude: 280° at sunrise
- Eponym: Ernst E. A. Back

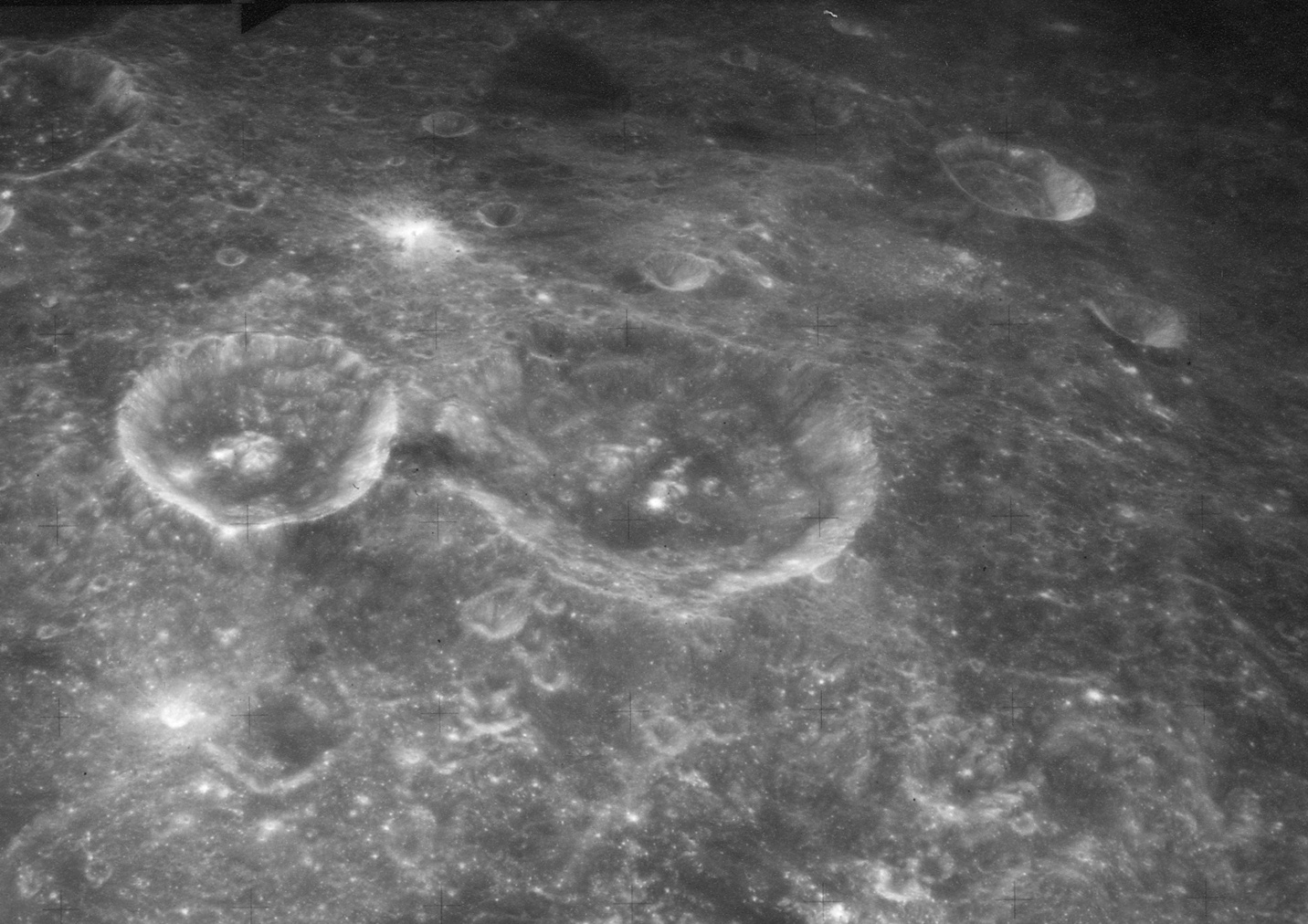
Oblique view of Back (left) and Schubert (center), facing west, from Apollo 15

Back is a small lunar impact crater that is located near the eastern limb of the Moon. It lies on the northwest edge of the Mare Smythii, and the northeast rim is adjacent to the crater Schubert. To the west is Jenkins, and to the southwest is the Weierstrass–Van Vleck crater pair.

Back is roughly circular, with narrow, sharp-edged outer walls that are not significantly worn. Despite its relatively small size, Back has a central peak typical of larger craters.

This crater is named after German physicist Ernst E. A. Back (1881–1959). Previously known as Schubert B, its designation was formally adopted by the IAU in 1976.
