= Geissler (crater) =

Lunar impact crater

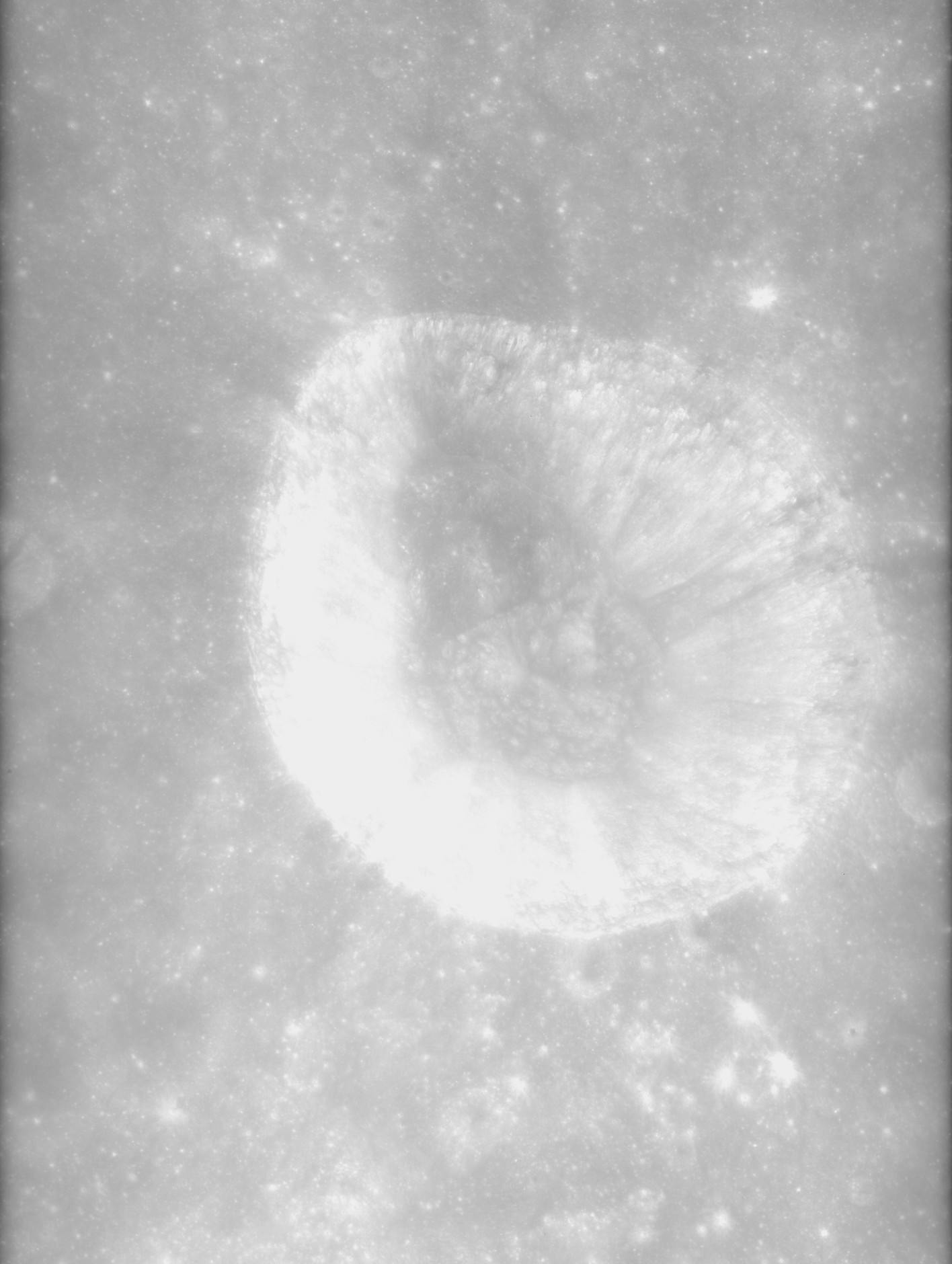
- Apollo 16 panoramic camera image
- Coordinates: 2.60°S 76.51°E
- Diameter: 17.39 km
- Depth: 3.0 km
- Colongitude: 284° at sunrise
- Eponym: Heinrich Geissler

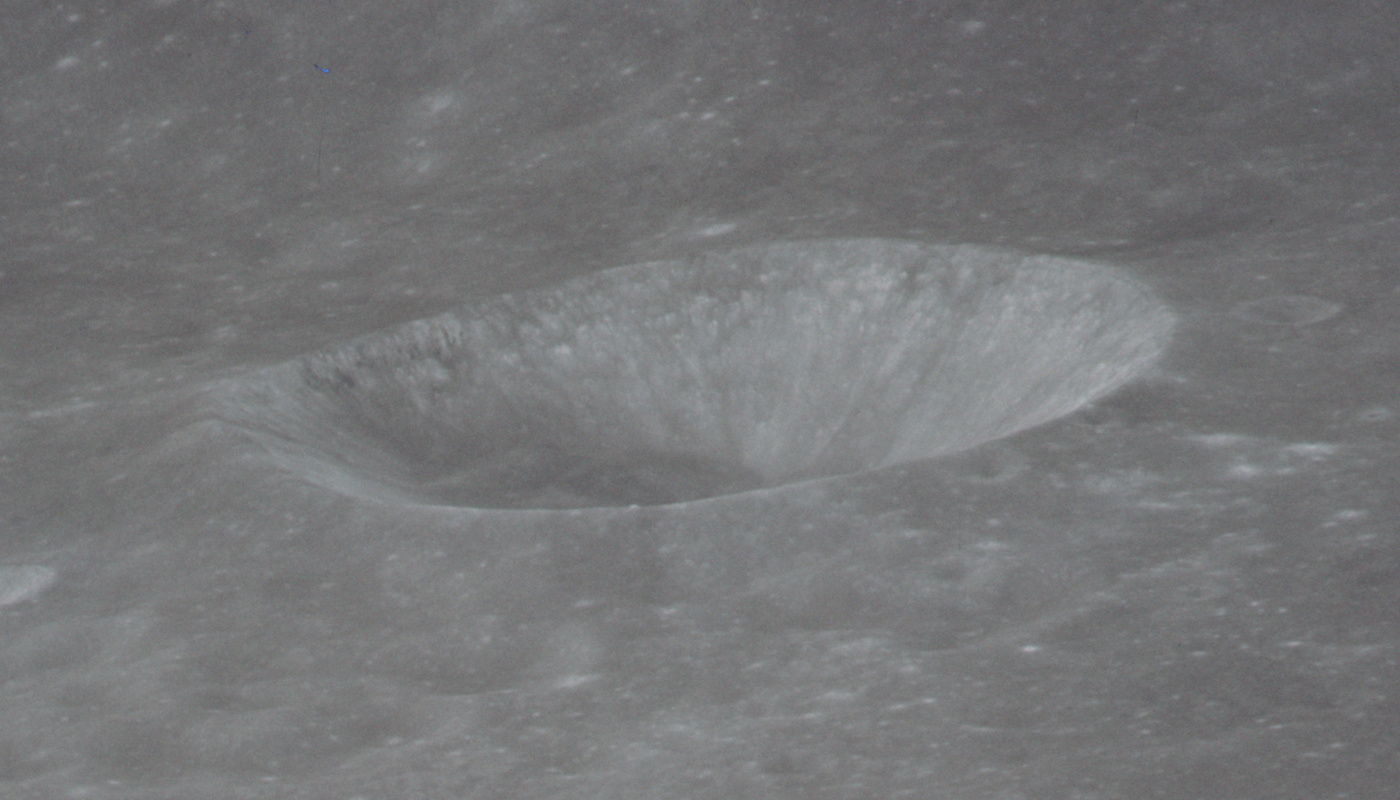
Oblique view from Apollo 14

Geissler is a small lunar impact crater that lies on the northern floor of a much larger walled plain called Gilbert, near the eastern limb of the Moon. Just to the northeast of this crater, attached to the outer rim of Gilbert, is the crater pair of Weierstrass and Van Vleck.

The rim of Geissler is nearly circular, with a slight outward bulge toward the northwest. The rim is sharp-edged and not notably worn. The inner walls are simple slopes that run down gradually to the small interior floor, which has a diameter about one third that of the crater. This formation is not significantly eroded, and is otherwise undistinguished.

This crater was formerly designated Gilbert D before being assigned a unique name by the IAU in 1976.
