= Theodor Friedrich von Schubert =

Theodor Friedrich von Schubert may refer to:

- Theodor von Schubert (1758-1825), astronomer
- Friedrich von Schubert (1789-1865), son of the former, infantry general in the Russian army
