= Charles Fothergill =

Canadian politician

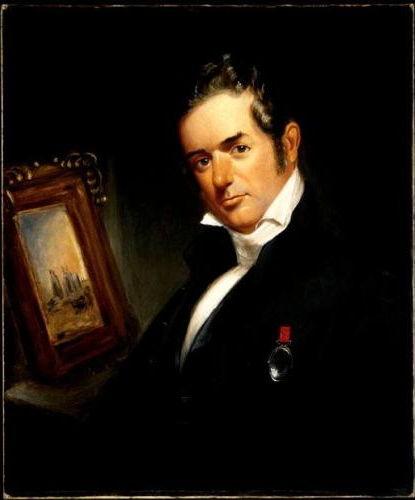
by Grove Sheldon Gilbert, 1834

Charles Fothergill (23 May 1782 – 22 May 1840) was a businessman, journalist and political figure in Upper Canada.

He was born in York, England in 1782, a member of a prominent Quaker family. He developed an interest in natural history at an early age and he published the Ornithologia Britannica at the age of 17. In 1813, he published Essay on the philosophy, study, and use of natural history. In 1817, partly to escape his debts, he came to Upper Canada and settled near Smith's Creek (Port Hope). He opened a general store and became the first postmaster at Port Hope in 1817. In 1818, he was appointed justice of the peace in the Newcastle District. He built a distillery at Port Hope and a sawmill and gristmill at Peterborough. At this point, however, he encountered financial problems and his properties were seized.

In 1822, he was appointed King's Printer and moved to York (Toronto). He also published a newspaper, the Weekly Register, and an almanac. The newspaper became involved in controversy when William Lyon Mackenzie claimed that a letter published in his own newspaper, which criticized Chief Justice William Dummer Powell, had been praised in Fothergill's paper; Fothergill denied that he had been referring to the same letter. In 1824, he ran against George Strange Boulton for the seat in Durham in the Legislative Assembly of Upper Canada; Boulton was elected after the returning officer cancelled 3 of Fothergill's votes. Fothergill appealed and won the seat in a by-election. In parliament, he was critical of the administration and he was dismissed as King's Printer in January 1826. He was reflected in Durham in 1828.

After being unsuccessful in gaining reelection in 1830, he attempted to start a number of businesses. During the 1830s, he also published An essay descriptive of the quadrupeds of British North America and another paper on the situation of the salmon in Lake Ontario; these works were well received but did not provide any income. He took over the ownership of two Toronto newspapers in 1837; however, this financial venture also failed. He died penniless in Toronto in 1840.

Fothergill wrote the first nature column to appear in an Upper Canada newspaper and is considered to be Ontario's first resident ornithologist.
