= Hubert Stanley Wall =

American mathematician (1902–1971)

- Born: December 2, 1902; Rockwell City, Iowa, U.S.
- Died: September 12, 1971 (aged 68); Austin, Texas, U.S.
- Education: Cornell College (BA, MA); University of Wisconsin–Madison (PhD)
- Known for: Continued fractions; Moore method
- Spouse: Mary Kate Parker (before 1971)
- Scientific career
- Fields: Mathematics
- Institutions: Northwestern University; Institute for Advanced Study; Illinois Institute of Technology; University of Texas
- Doctoral advisor: Edward Burr Van Vleck
- Doctoral students: Coke Reed

Hubert Stanley Wall (December 2, 1902 – September 12, 1971) was an American mathematician who worked primarily in the field of continued fractions. He is also known as one of the leading proponents of the Moore method of teaching.

== Early life and education ==
Hubert Stanley Wall was born in Rockwell City, Iowa on December 2, 1902. He received a Bachelor of Arts and a Master of Arts from Cornell College in Mount Vernon, Iowa in 1924. He received his Ph.D. degree from the University of Wisconsin (now University of Wisconsin–Madison) in 1927.

He married Mary Kate Parker, a lawyer and Texas assistant Attorney General. Her specialty was election law.

== Career ==
Upon receiving his Ph.D. Wall joined the faculty at Northwestern University and stayed until 1944 except for the academic year 1938–1939 when he was at the Institute for Advanced Study. He then went to the Illinois Institute of Technology for two years before moving in 1946 to the University of Texas where he spent the rest of his career. He became an emeritus professor in 1970.

Most of Wall's mathematical research was in various aspects of the analytic theory of continued fractions. This included the theory of positive-definite continued fractions, convergence results for continued fractions, parabola theorems, Hausdorff moments, and Hausdorff summability. He studied the polynomials now named Wall polynomials after him.

While at Northwestern he started a collaboration with Ernst Hellinger, and he was very interested in Hellinger integrals throughout his career, but did publish anything on them.

While at Texas Wall was a prominent practitioner of the Moore method of teaching. John Parker wrote, "Wall had long ago thrown himself wholeheartedly into the Moore tradition, with his own interpretation of the Moore method, and there was a good deal of cross pollination of students through their courses, some steered to the PhD by Moore and others by Wall and Hyman J. Ettlinger. Between them, they continued to dominate PhD guidance in Pure Mathematics throughout the 1950s and 1960s." The University of Texas memorial to Wall suggests that he may have picked up some of these ideas at Northwestern from Van Vleck and Hellinger and says, "Since there were already people on the Texas faculty who had used innovative techniques (chiefly Robert Lee Moore and some of his colleagues), Wall tried their methods. For him and for his students it was an unqualified success."

Wall had 66 doctoral students, 61 at the University of Texas.

Wall died in Austin, Texas, on September 12, 1971.

== Selected publications ==
- Wall, H. S. (2000) [1948]. Analytic Theory of Continued Fractions. Providence: American Mathematical Society. ISBN 978-0-8218-2106-0. OCLC 43311799.
- Wall, H. S. (1969) [1963]. Creative Mathematics. Univ of Texas Press. ISBN 0-292-71039-9.
