= Edward Burr Van Vleck =

American mathematician (1863–1943)

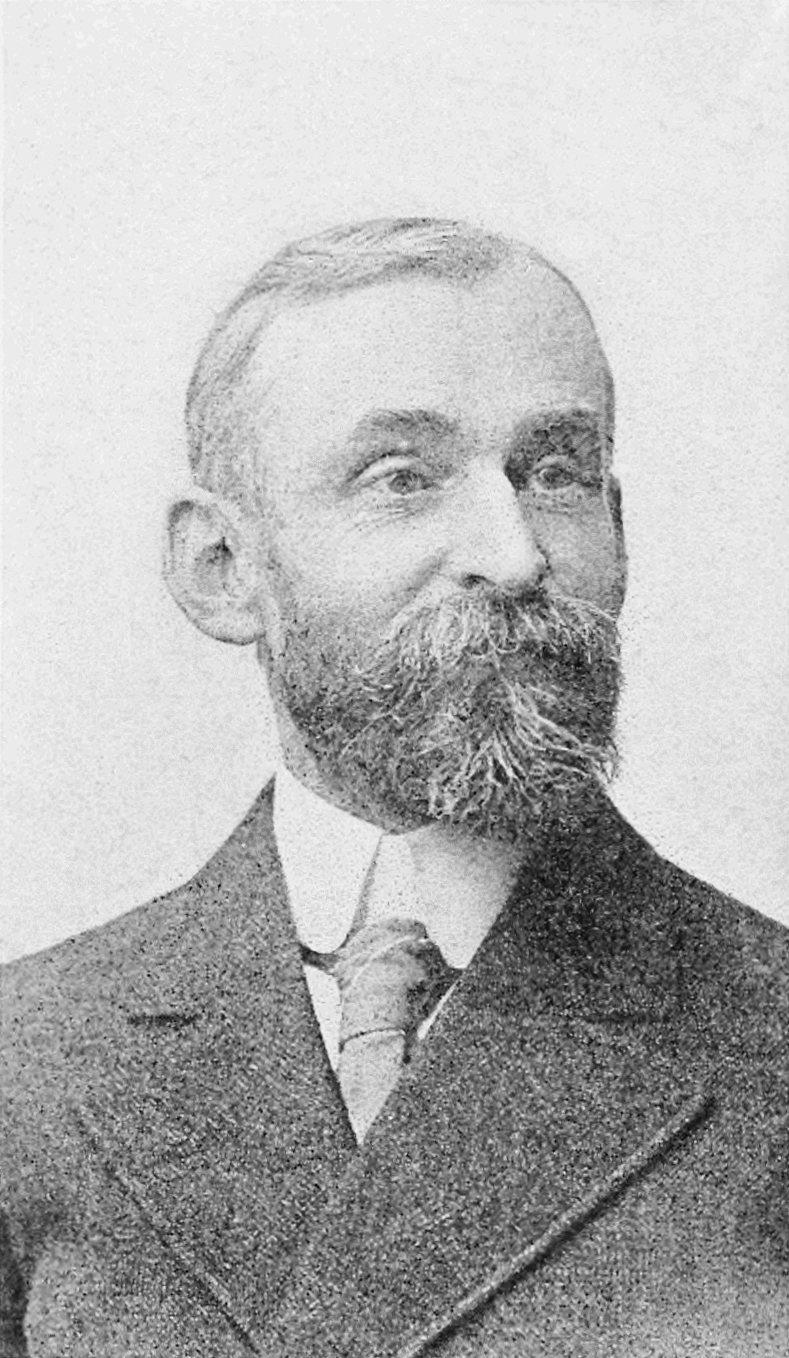
- Van Vleck in 1913
- Born: June 7, 1863; Middletown, Connecticut, U.S.
- Died: June 2, 1943 (aged 79); Madison, Wisconsin, U.S.
- Resting place: Forest Hill Cemetery
- Education: Wesleyan University; Johns Hopkins University; University of Göttingen (PhD)
- Known for: Van Vleck polynomials; Van Vleck's theorem
- Children: John Hasbrouck Van Vleck
- Father: John Monroe Van Vleck
- Scientific career
- Fields: Mathematics
- Workplaces: Wesleyan University; University of Wisconsin–Madison
- Doctoral students: Hubert Stanley Wall

Edward Burr Van Vleck (June 7, 1863 – June 2, 1943) was an American mathematician. He is the namesake of Van Vleck polynomials and Van Vleck's theorem.

== Life and career ==
Edward Burr Van Vleck was born on June 7, 1863, in Middletown, Connecticut, the son of mathematician and astronomer John Monroe Van Vleck. He graduated from Wesleyan University in 1884, attended Johns Hopkins University from 1885 to 1887, and studied at the University of Göttingen, where he attained his Ph.D. in 1893. He also received an honorary doctorate on July 1, 1914, from the University of Groningen.

He was a professor and an assistant professor at Wesleyan University from 1895 to 1906. After 1906, he was a professor at the University of Wisconsin–Madison, where the mathematics building is named after him. His doctoral students include Hubert Stanley Wall. In 1913, he became president of the American Mathematical Society, of whose Transactions he had been first associate editor (1902–1905) and then editor (1905–1910). He was the author of Theory of Divergent Series and Algebraic Continued Fractions (1903) and of several monographs in mathematical journals.

His son, John Hasbrouck Van Vleck, was a notable physicist who received the Nobel Prize in Physics in 1977. Tom Van Vleck, a software engineer who co-authored an early email program, is related to him.

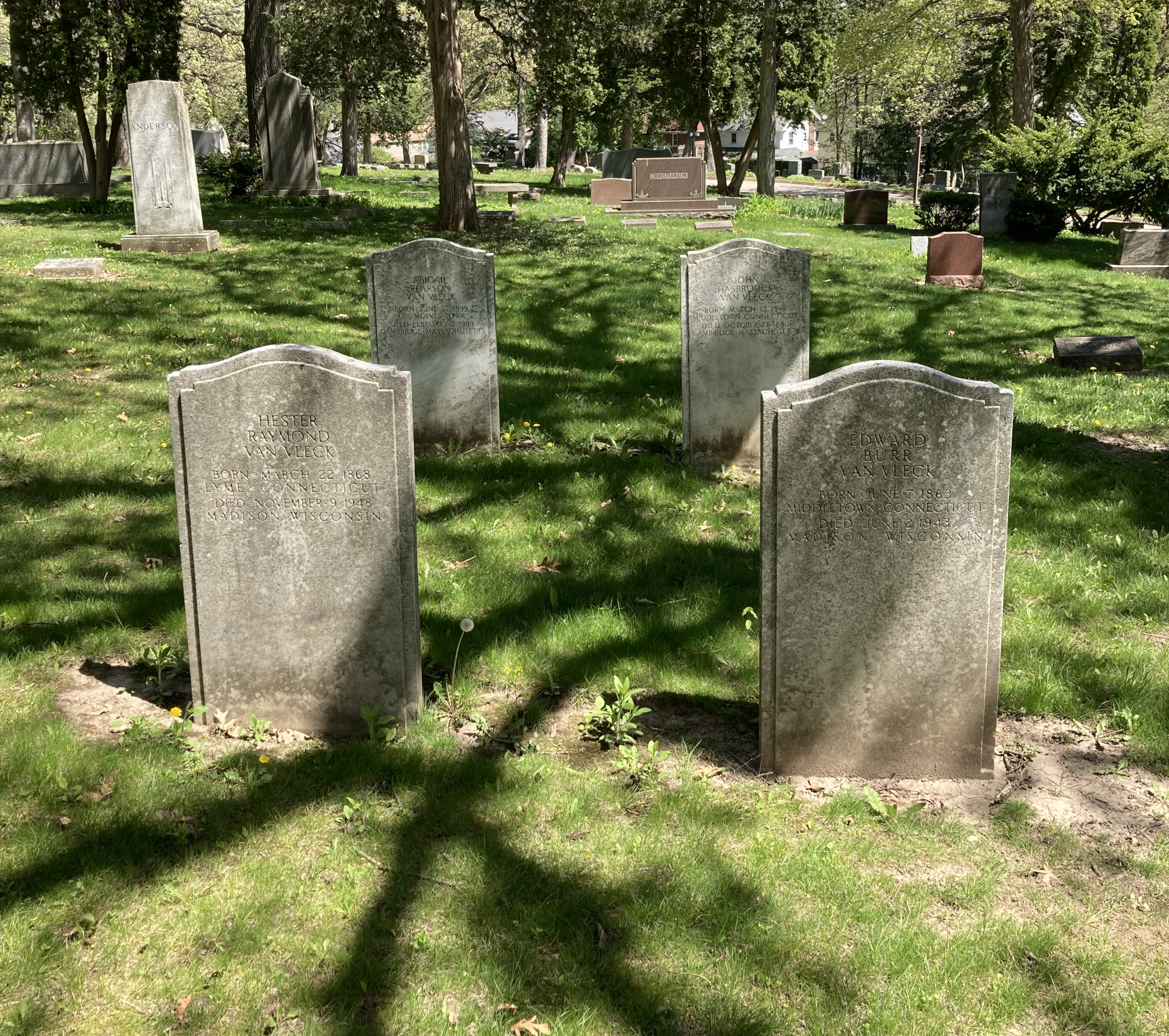
Van Vleck's grave (front right) at Forest Hill Cemetery

Van Vleck died at his home in Madison, Wisconsin, on June 2, 1943. He is buried at Forest Hill Cemetery.

== Japanese art collection ==
Edward Burr Van Vleck was also an important collector of Japanese woodblock prints, principally Ukiyo-e. He started his collection, known as the E. B. Van Vleck Collection, around 1909 but became a serious collector in the late 1920s, when he acquired approximately 4,000 prints previously owned by Frank Lloyd Wright. His collection, one of the largest in the world outside the Library of Congress, features more than 2,000 prints by Utagawa Hiroshige, as well as many prints by Hokusai, and fine examples of shin-hanga (new prints) made well into the 20th century. It was donated to the Chazen Museum of Art by his son, John Hasbrouck Van Vleck, and his wife, Abigail, where it resides.

== Publications ==
- Van Vleck, E. B. (1898). "On the polynomials of Stieltjes". Bull. Amer. Math. Soc. 4 (9): 426–438. doi:10.1090/s0002-9904-1898-00531-1. MR 1557633.
- Van Vleck, E. B. (1901). "On the convergence of continued fractions with complex elements". Trans. Amer. Math. Soc. 2 (3): 215–233. doi:10.1090/s0002-9947-1901-1500565-4. MR 1500565.
- Van Vleck, Edward B. (1902). "A determination of the number of real and imaginary roots of the hypergeometric series". Trans. Amer. Math. Soc. 3 (1): 110–131. doi:10.1090/s0002-9947-1902-1500590-4. MR 1500456.
- Van Vleck, Edward B. (1904). "On the convergence of algebraic continued fractions whose coefficients have limiting values". Trans. Amer. Math. Soc. 5 (3): 253–262. doi:10.1090/s0002-9947-1904-1500672-9. MR 1500672.
- Selected topics in the theory of divergent series and of continued fractions (New York; MacMillan, 1905).

== See also ==
- Arcsine law
- Gauss's continued fraction
- Carol S. Wood, Edward Burr Van Vleck Professor of Mathematics, Emerita at Wesleyan
