= Louise Freeland Jenkins =

American astronomer

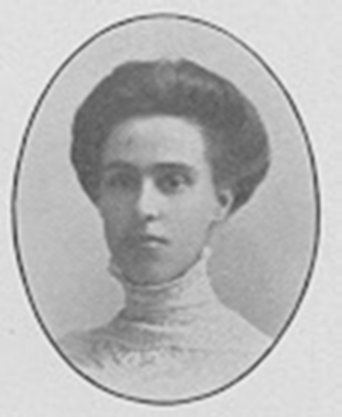
- Jenkins in 1911
- Born: July 5, 1888; Fitchburg, Massachusetts
- Died: May 9, 1970 (aged 81)
- Education: Mount Holyoke College
- Scientific career
- Fields: Astronomy
- Workplaces: Yale University Observatory; Women's Christian College; Hinomoto Gakuen Girl's High School; Allegheny Observatory

Louise Freeland Jenkins (July 5, 1888 – May 9, 1970) was an American astronomer who compiled a valuable catalogue of stars within 10 parsecs of the sun, as well as editing the 3rd edition of the Yale Bright Star Catalogue.

She was born in Fitchburg, Massachusetts. In 1911 she graduated from Mount Holyoke College, then she received a Master's degree in astronomy in 1917 from the same institution. From 1913 to 1915 she worked at the Allegheny Observatory in Pittsburgh. Afterwards, she was an instructor at Mount Holyoke from 1915 to 1920.

About 1921 she moved to Japan, becoming a teacher at the Women's Christian College, a missionary school. She returned to the United States in 1925 after her father died. A year later she returned to teach at a school in Himeji. (Hinomoto Gakuen girl's high school.)

In 1932 she returned to the US and became a staff member at Yale University Observatory. She was co-editor of the Astronomical Journal starting in 1942, and continued in this post until 1958. She would return to visit Japan later in her life.

She was noted for her research into the trigonometric parallax of nearby stars. She also studied variable stars.

== Bibliography ==
- Frank Schlesinger and Louise F. Jenkins, Yale Bright Star Catalogue, 2nd edition.
- Louise F. Jenkins, General Catalogue of Trigonometric Stellar Parallaxes, Yale University Observatory, New Haven, Connecticut, 1952. Supplement 1963.

== Honors ==
- The crater Jenkins on the Moon is named after her.
