= Nobili (crater) =

Crater on the Moon

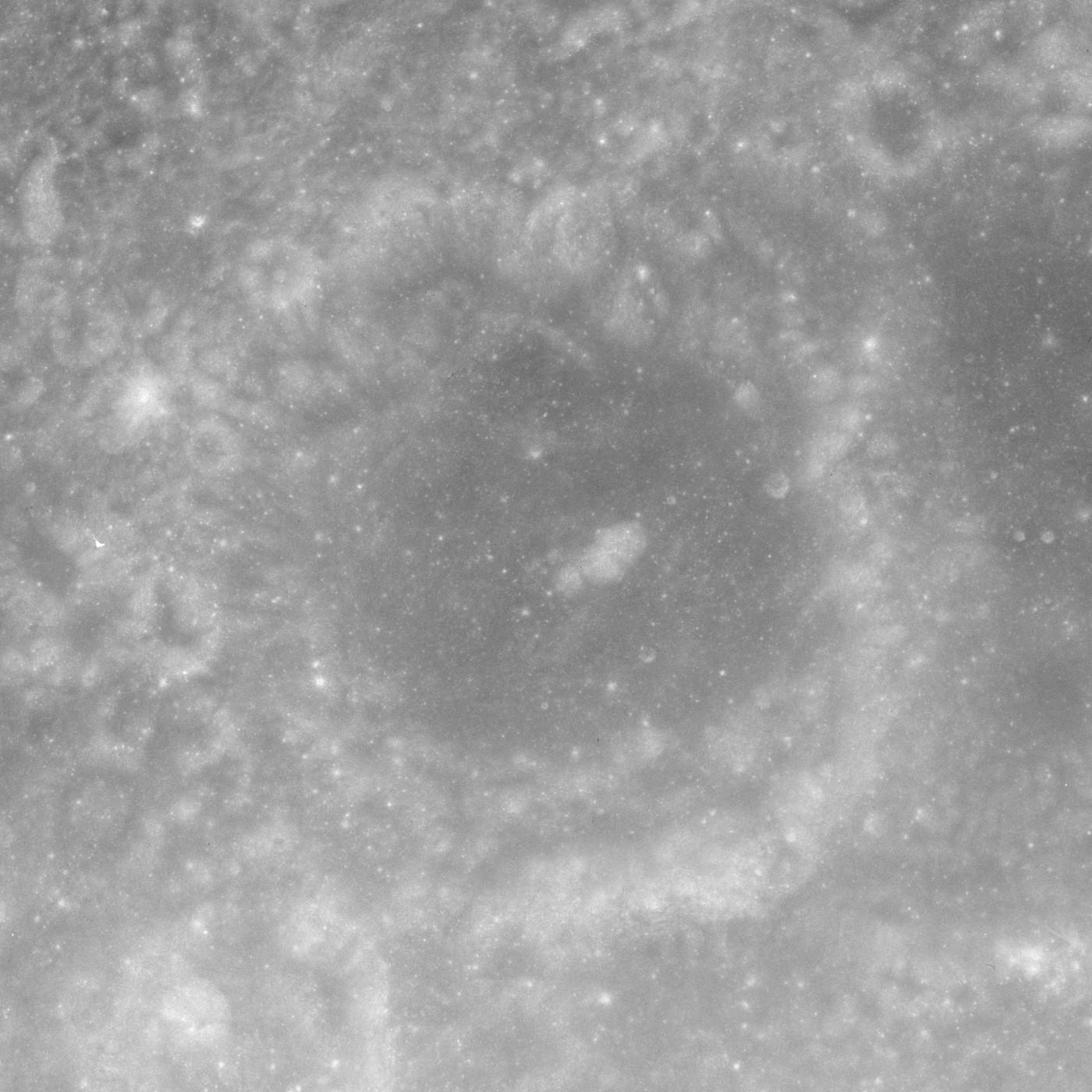
- Apollo 16 Mapping Camera image
- Coordinates: 0.17°N 75.95°E
- Diameter: 41.79 km
- Depth: Unknown
- Colongitude: 285° at sunrise
- Eponym: Leopoldo Nobili

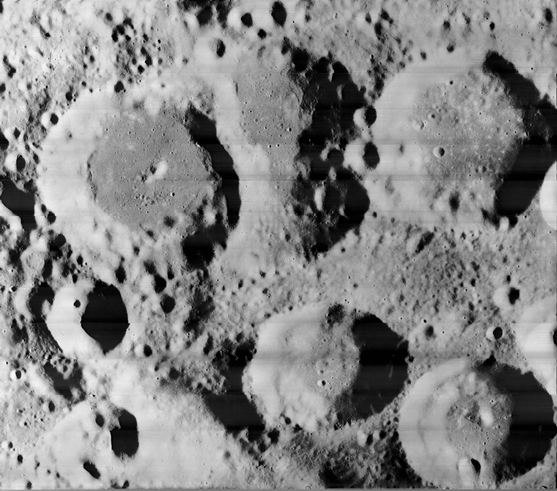
The craters Weierstrass (lower center), Van Vleck (lower right), Nobili (upper left) and Jenkins (upper right) from Lunar Orbiter 1

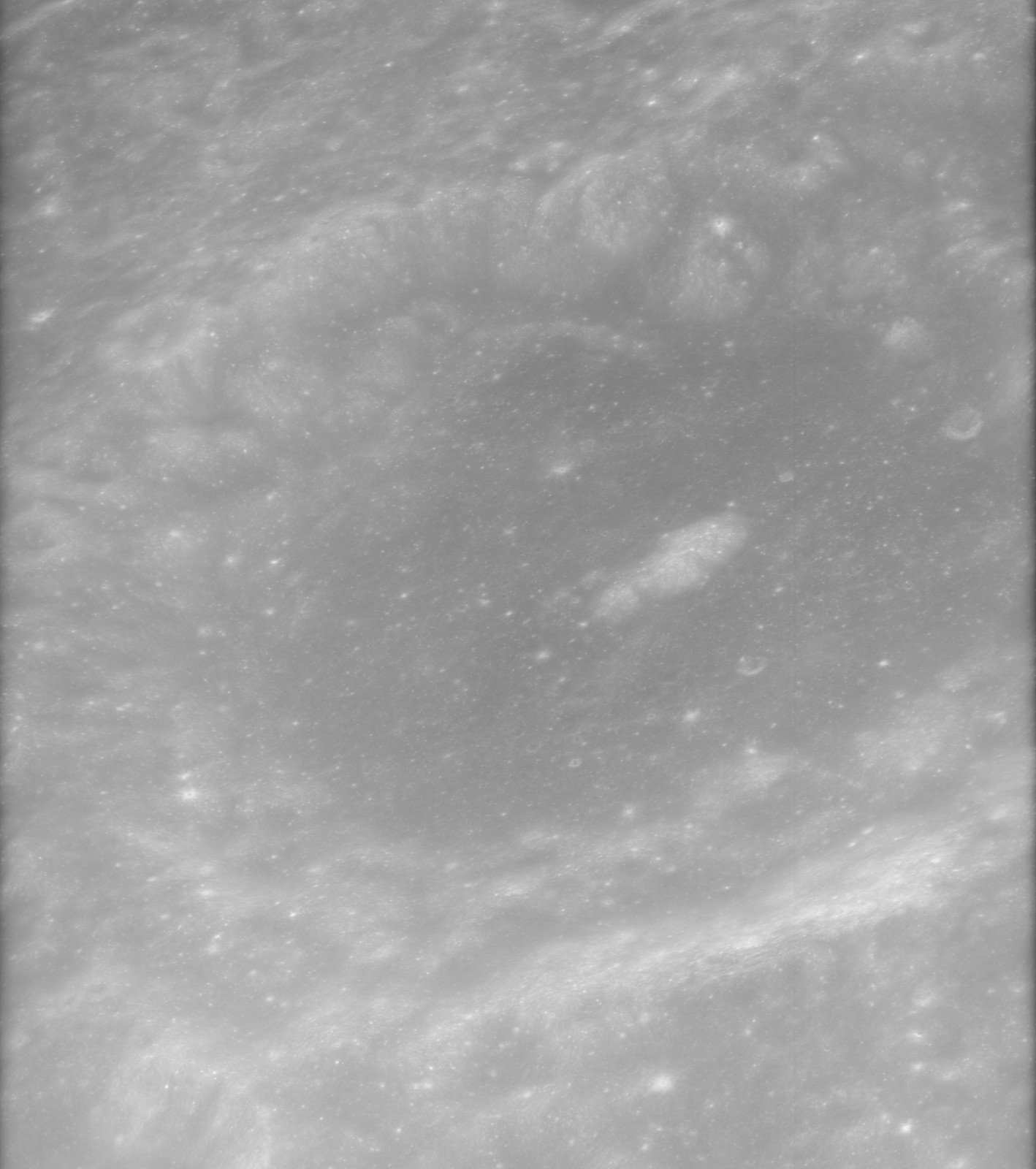
Oblique view of interior from Apollo 16

Nobili is a lunar impact crater that lies near the eastern limb of the Moon, giving it a foreshortened appearance when viewed from the Earth. The crater overlies the western rim of the slightly larger crater Schubert X, and the eastern rim of this satellite crater is overlain in turn by Jenkins, resulting in a triple crater formation. To the south lies Gilbert.

Nobili is a circular crater formation with a worn, circular rim. The rim wall is smaller along the eastern side where it overlaps Schubert X. A small crater, Gilbert P, is attached to the southwestern rim, and there is a small break in the northeastern rim. The interior floor is nearly featureless, with a small double-peak formation at the center.

This crater was previously designated Schubert Y, before being given its current name by the IAU in 1976.
