= Heun function =

Function for Heun's differential equation

In mathematics, the local Heun function $H \ell (a,q;\alpha ,\beta, \gamma, \delta ; z)$ is the solution of Heun's differential equation that is holomorphic and 1 at the singular point z = 0. The local Heun function is called a Heun function, denoted Hf, if it is also regular at z = 1, and is called a Heun polynomial, denoted Hp, if it is regular at all three finite singular points z = 0, 1, a.

It is named after German mathematician Karl Heun.

== Heun's equation ==
Heun's equation is a second-order linear ordinary differential equation (ODE) of the form

$$\frac {d^2w}{dz^2} +
\left[\frac{\gamma}{z}+ \frac{\delta}{z-1} + \frac{\epsilon}{z-a} \right]
\frac {dw}{dz}
+ \frac {\alpha \beta z -q} {z(z-1)(z-a)} w = 0.$$

The condition $\epsilon=\alpha+\beta-\gamma-\delta+1$ is taken so that the characteristic exponents for the regular singularity at infinity are α and β (see below).

The complex number q is called the accessory parameter. Heun's equation has four regular singular points: 0, 1, a and ∞ with exponents (0, 1 − γ), (0, 1 − δ), (0, 1 − ϵ), and (α, β). Every second-order linear ODE on the extended complex plane with at most four regular singular points, such as the Lamé equation or the hypergeometric differential equation, can be transformed into this equation by a change of variable.

Coalescence of various regular singularities of the Heun equation into irregular singularities give rise to several confluent forms of the equation, as shown in the table below.

Forms of the Heun Equation
Form	Singularities	Equation
General	0, 1, a, ∞	$\frac{d^2w}{dz^2} + \left[\frac{\gamma}{z}+ \frac{\delta}{z-1} + \frac{\epsilon}{z-a} \right] \frac{dw}{dz} + \frac{\alpha \beta z -q}{z(z-1)(z-a)} w = 0$
Confluent	0, 1, ∞ (irregular, rank 1)	$\frac{d^2w}{dz^2} + \left[\frac{\gamma}{z}+ \frac{\delta}{z-1} + \epsilon \right] \frac{dw}{dz} + \frac{\alpha z -q}{z(z-1)} w = 0$
Doubly Confluent	0 (irregular, rank 1), ∞ (irregular, rank 1)	$\frac{d^2w}{dz^2} + \left[\frac{\delta}{z^2}+ \frac{\gamma}{z} + 1 \right] \frac{dw}{dz} + \frac{\alpha z -q}{z^2} w = 0$
Biconfluent	0, ∞ (irregular, rank 2)	$\frac{d^2w}{dz^2} - \left[\frac{\gamma}{z}+ \delta + z \right] \frac{dw}{dz} + \frac{\alpha z -q}{z} w = 0$
Triconfluent	∞ (irregular, rank 3)	$\frac{d^2w}{dz^2} + \left(\gamma + z \right) z \frac{dw}{dz} + \left(\alpha z -q\right) w = 0$

== q-analog ==
The q-analog of Heun's equation has been discovered by Hahn (1971) and studied by Takemura in 2017.

== Symmetries ==
Heun's equation has a group of symmetries of order 192, isomorphic to the Coxeter group of the Coxeter diagram D_{4}, analogous to the 24 symmetries of the hypergeometric differential equations obtained by Kummer.

The symmetries fixing the local Heun function form a group of order 24 isomorphic to the symmetric group on 4 points, so there are 192/24 = 8 = 2 × 4 essentially different solutions given by acting on the local Heun function by these symmetries, which give solutions for each of the 2 exponents for each of the 4 singular points. The complete list of 192 symmetries was given by Maier (2007) using machine calculation. Several previous attempts by various authors to list these by hand contained many errors and omissions; for example, most of the 48 local solutions listed by Heun contain serious errors.

== See also ==
- Heine–Stieltjes polynomials, a generalization of Heun polynomials.
