= Ernst Emil Alexander Back =

German physicist

- Born: October 21, 1881; Freiburg
- Died: June 20, 1959 (aged 77); Munich
- Occupation: physicist

Ernst Emil Alexander Back (October 21, 1881 – June 20, 1959) was a German physicist, born in Freiburg. He attended school in Strasbourg until 1900, and from 1902 until 1906 studied law in Strasbourg, Munich, and Berlin. He then worked in the legal profession in Alsace-Lorraine until 1909, afterwards taking leave to study physics in Tübingen. He retired from the legal profession in 1912, and earned his Ph.D. in 1913. His thesis, titled Zur Prestonschen Regel, was on the subject of what would later be called the Paschen-Back effect, and was named after Back and Friedrich Paschen.

Between 1914 and 1918 he served with the German Army during World War I. Following this conflict he became head of a Veifa-Werke laboratory in Frankfurt am Main, a company that produced electrical and X-ray equipment. In 1920 he left to become an assistant at the Physics Institute in Tübingen. He was promoted to professor in 1926 at Hohenheim University, and became a full professor in 1929. He remained at this post until 1936 when he returned to become a professor at Tübingen.

From 1926 to 1927 Samuel Abraham Goudsmit worked with Back to make the first measurement of nuclear spin and its Zeeman effect.

Back retired in 1948, and died in Munich over a decade later. The crater Back on the Moon is named in his memory.
