= Avery (crater) =

Crater on the Moon

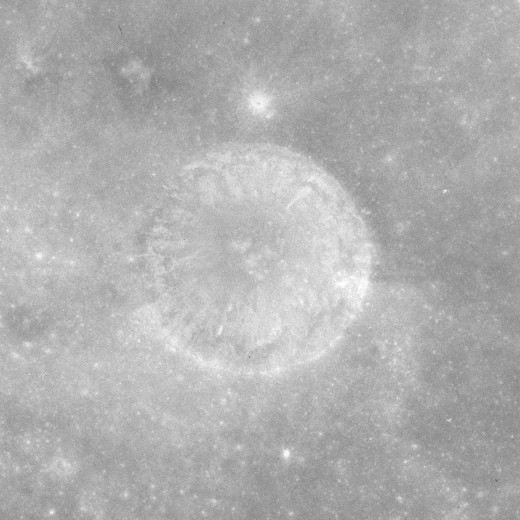
- Apollo 16 Mapping Camera image
- Coordinates: 1.4°S 81.4°E
- Diameter: 10.73 km (6.67 mi)
- Depth: 2.17 km (1.35 mi)
- Colongitude: 279° at sunrise
- Formation: Copernican
- Eponym: Oswald T. Avery

Avery is a small lunar impact crater located near the eastern limb of the Moon. It has an estimated age of ~150 ma, which puts it in the Copernican period of the lunar geologic timescale. This is a circular, bowl-shaped formation with a small interior floor at the center. It is 10.7 km in diameter with walls that slope down to a depth of 2,170 m. This crater lies near the western edge of Mare Smythii. To the east is the crater Haldane, and to the southwest is Carrillo. Gilbert lies to the southwest.

Avery was previously designated as satellite feature Gilbert U, before its name was formally adopted by the IAU in 1976. It is named after the Canadian-American biomedical researcher Oswald Avery (1877-1955).
