= Jenkins (crater) =

Lunar impact crater

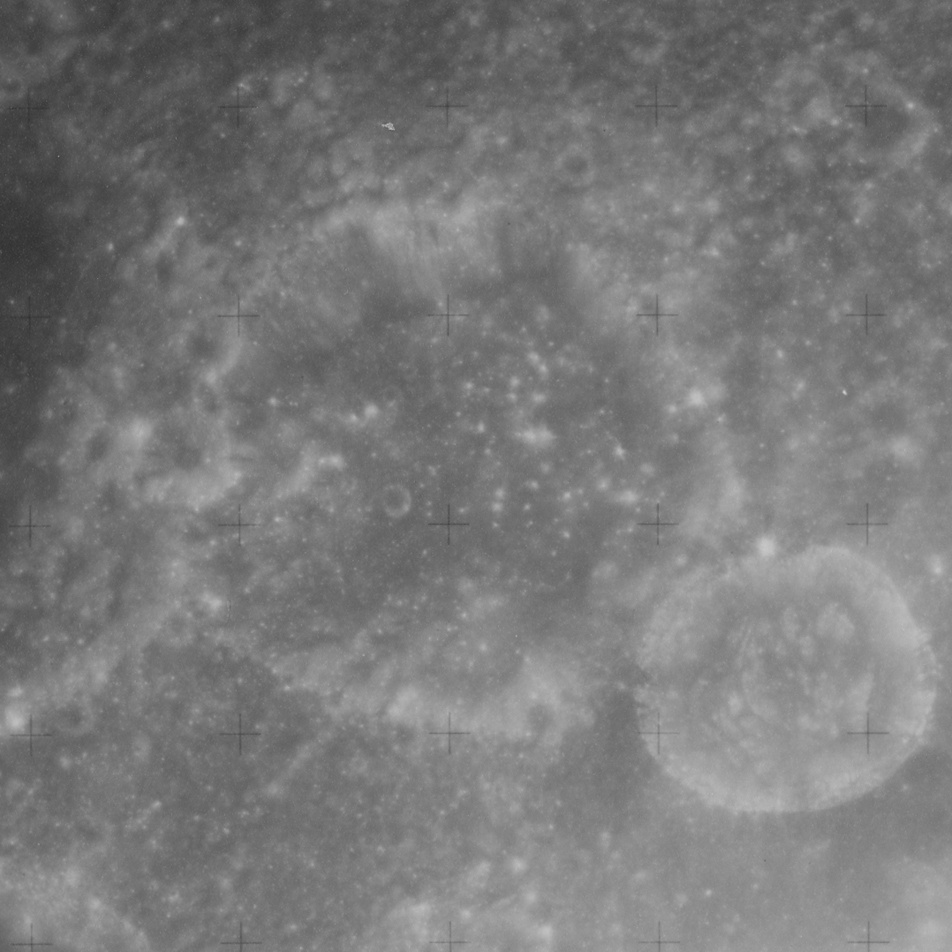
- Apollo 16 Mapping Camera image
- Coordinates: 0.37°N 78.04°E
- Diameter: 37.77 km
- Depth: Unknown
- Colongitude: 282° at sunrise
- Eponym: Louise F. Jenkins

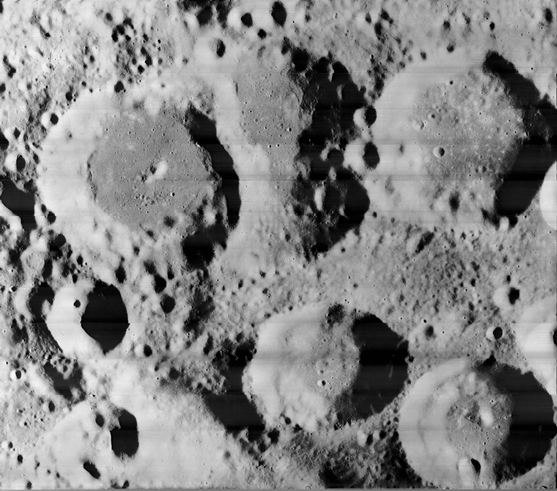
The craters Weierstrass (lower center), Van Vleck (lower right), Nobili (upper left) and Jenkins (upper right) from Lunar Orbiter 1

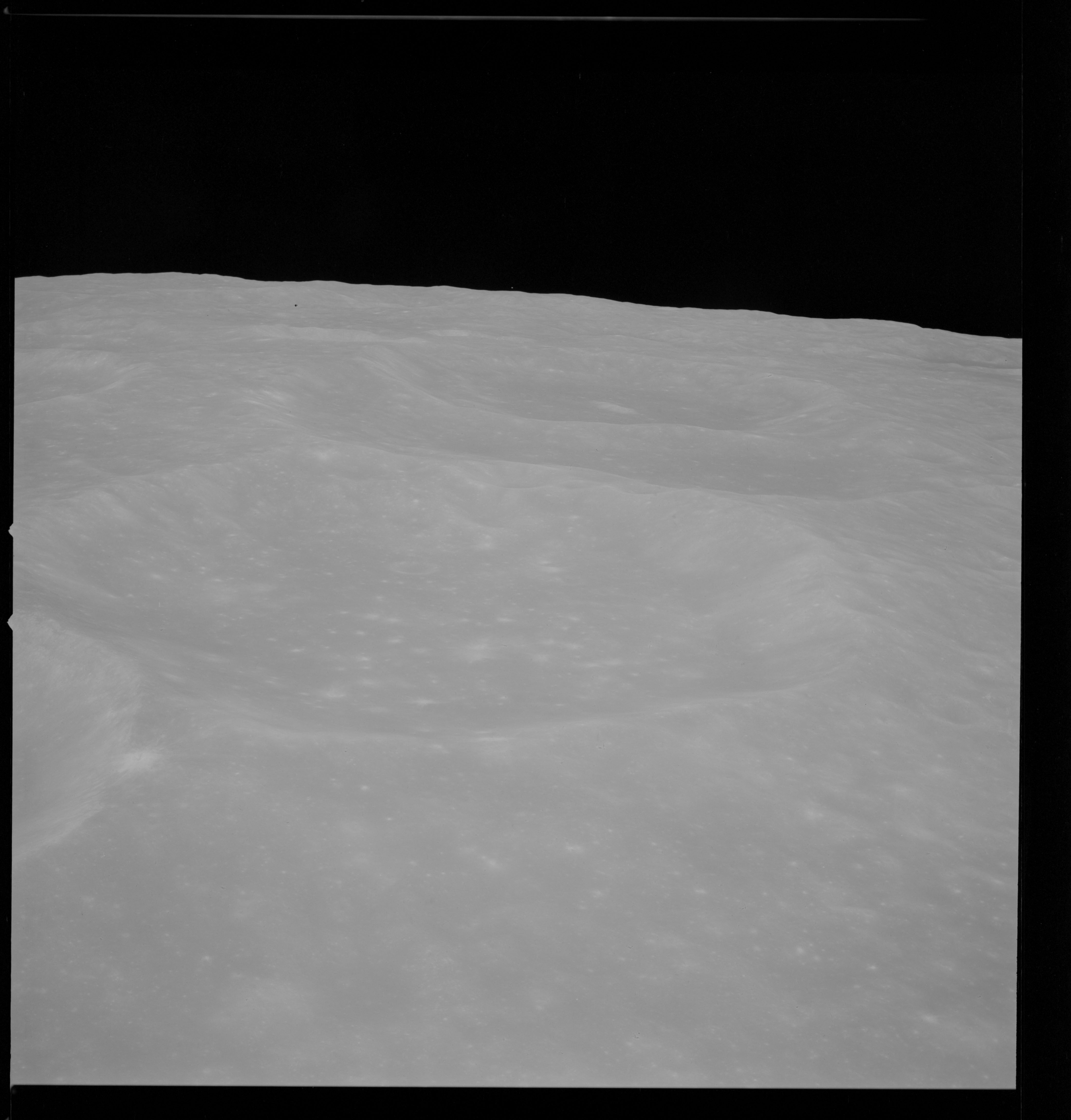
Oblique view of Jenkins facing west with Nobili in background, from Apollo 10

Jenkins is a lunar impact crater that lies along the equator of the Moon, near the eastern limb. It is attached to the eastern rim of the slightly larger crater Schubert X, intruding somewhat into the interior. The crater Nobili is likewise attached to the western rim of Schubert X and intrudes slightly into the interior on that side. The three craters form a linear chain along the equator.

This formation was previously designated Schubert Z before being given its current name by the IAU in 1982. Schubert itself is located to the northeast of Jenkins. To the east-northeast of Jenkins lies the crater Back, and to the south is the crater pair of Van Vleck and Weierstrass.

This is a circular crater with a somewhat worn rim. The small crater Schubert J is attached to the exterior along the southeast. The western rim of Jenkins is marked by several small craters. The interior floor is relatively featureless, and is marked by a few tiny craters. There is no central peak on the floor.
