= Carol Wood =

American mathematician

Carol Saunders Wood
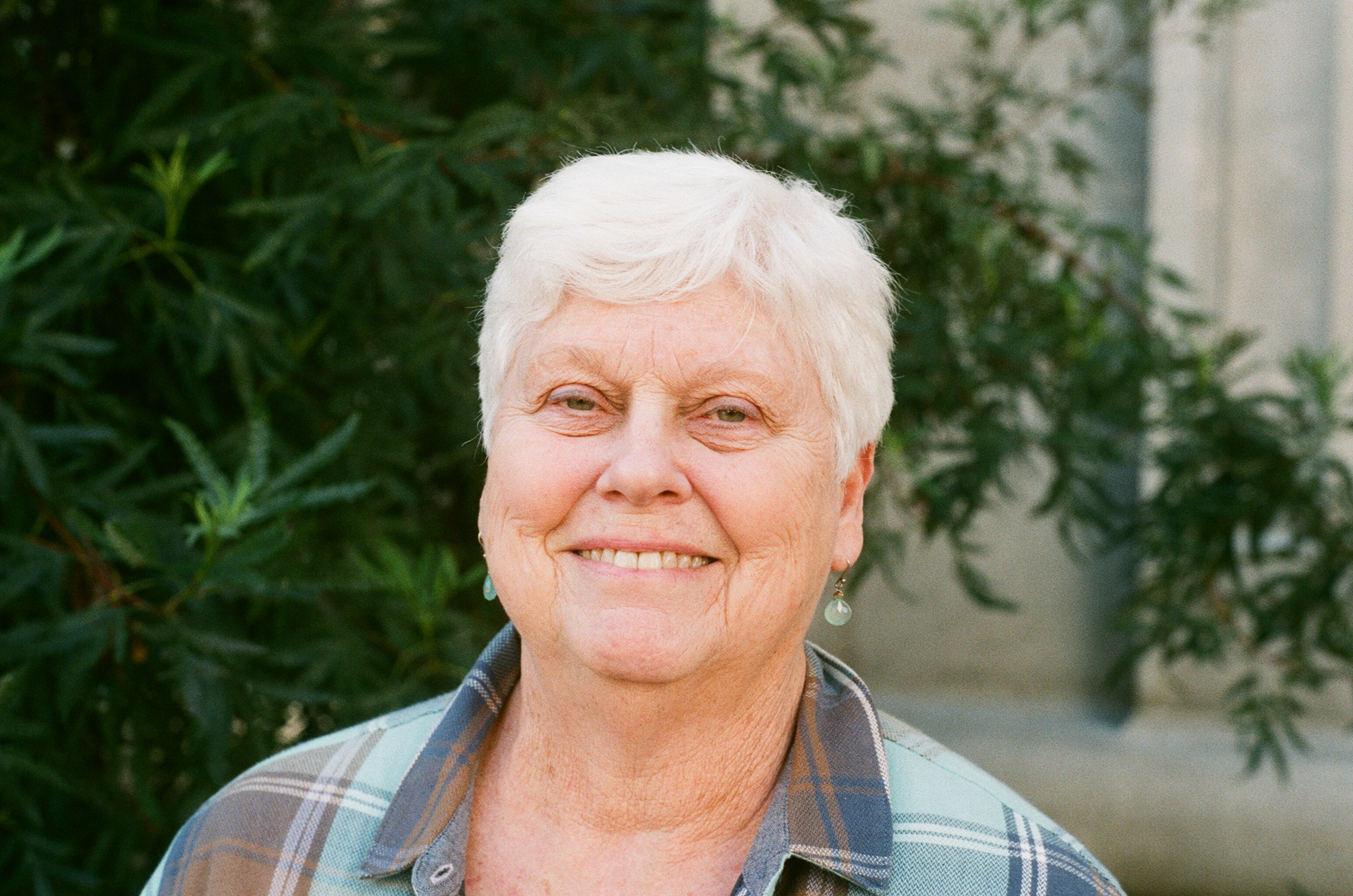
- Wood in 2017
- Born: February 9, 1945 (age 81); Pennington Gap, Virginia
- Education: Yale University
- Known for: Differentially Closed Fields
- Scientific career
- Fields: Mathematics
- Doctoral advisor: Abraham Robinson

Carol Saunders Wood (born February 9, 1945) is a retired American mathematician, the Edward Burr Van Vleck Professor of Mathematics, Emerita, at Wesleyan University. Her research concerns mathematical logic and model-theoretic algebra, and in particular the theory of differentially closed fields.

Wood graduated in 1966 from Randolph-Macon Woman's College, a small United Methodist college in Lynchburg, Virginia. She earned her doctorate in 1971 from Yale University with a dissertation on forcing supervised by Abraham Robinson. At Wesleyan, she served three times as department chair. She was an American Mathematical Society (AMS) Council member at large from 1987 to 1989. She was president of the Association for Women in Mathematics from 1991 to 1993, and served on the board of trustees of the American Mathematical Society from 2002 to 2007. She has served on the AMS Committee on Women in Mathematics since it was formed in 2012 and was chair from 2012 to 2015. She supervised 4 doctoral students at Wesleyan.

Wood was the 1998 commencement speaker for mathematics at the University of California, Berkeley. In 2012, she became one of the inaugural fellows of the American Mathematical Society. In 2017, she was selected as a fellow of the Association for Women in Mathematics in the inaugural class.
