= Coke Reed =

American mathematician and computer scientist (1940–2026)

Coke S. Reed
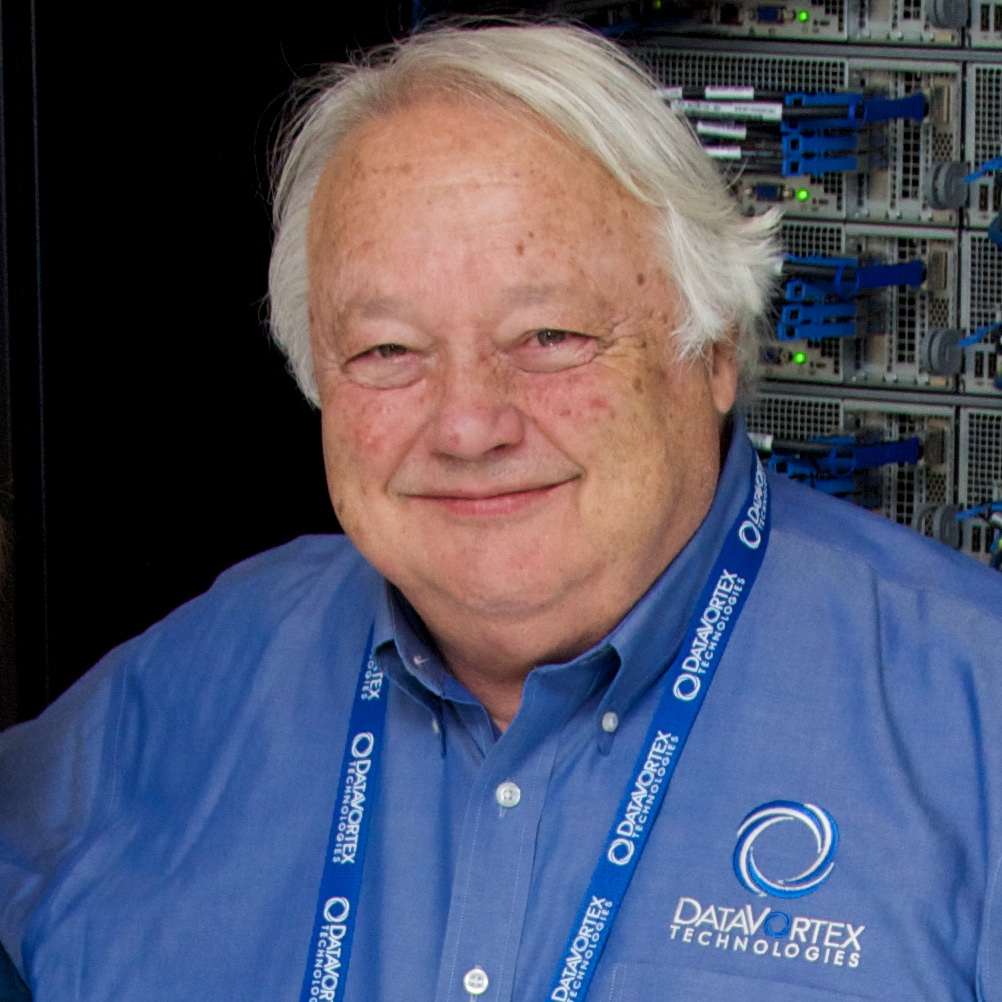
- Reed in front of a Data Vortex Technologies DV206 Supercomputer
- Born: Coke Stevenson Reed; March 8, 1940; Austin, Texas, U.S.
- Died: October 5, 2026 (aged 86); Lakeway, Texas, U.S.
- Education: The University of Texas at Austin (BS, MS, and PhD)
- Occupations: Mathematician, inventor, cryptanalyst
- Known for: Topology, dynamical systems, Inventor of the Data Vortex
- Spouse: Sylvia Reed
- Scientific career
- Thesis: Concerning Pointwise Limits of Sequences of Functions (1966)
- Doctoral advisor: Hubert Stanley Wall

Coke Stevenson Reed (March 8, 1940 – October 5, 2026) was an American mathematician and inventor from Austin, Texas. He was the inventor of the proprietary Data Vortex network, a privately held US company composed largely of former members of the United States defense community. Implementations of this network into supercomputers use a novel topology and switch logic based on his and Krystyna Kuperberg's solution to a problem posed by Stan Ulam in the Scottish Book.

Coke completed his Ph.D. at the University of Texas at Austin under Hubert Stanley Wall.

== Life and career ==
In his work with the Department of Defense and Department of Energy, Reed developed a thorough understanding of the existing pitfalls of computer networks and performance. His career has included positions at the Institute for Defense Analyses, Los Alamos National Laboratories, the United States Space Program, and the Microelectronics and Computer Technology Corporation. At Los Alamos, Reed worked in Physics and mathematics. Reed received his PhD in 1966 under Dr. Hubert S. Wall at the University of Texas at Austin. His academic appointments have included the University of Texas, Auburn University, Georgia Tech, the University of Colorado Boulder, and Princeton University.

His contributions to national security were recognized in 1990 by the Department of Defense when he was awarded the Exceptionally Meritorious Civilian Service Award Medal.

Reed worked on implementation of the Data Vortex in novel spaces, such as exploration into knowledge-based computing, shared memory, and streaming dynamic graph analysis. He authored multiple patents, the most recent of which explores the embodiment of the Data Vortex switch directly onto silicon for connecting processor cores at every level of IT infrastructure.

Reed died in Lakeway, Texas, on October 5, 2026, at the age of 86.
