= Nabor Carrillo Flores =

Rector of the National Autonomous University of Mexico
- In office 14 February 1953 – 13 January 1961
- Preceded by: Garrido Díaz
- Succeeded by: Ignacio Chávez Sánchez

Personal details
- Born: 23 February 1911 Mexico City, Mexico
- Died: 19 February 1967 (aged 55) Mexico City, Mexico
- Education: National Autonomous University of Mexico, Harvard
- Profession: Civil engineer

Nabor Carrillo Flores (23 February 1911, in Mexico City – 19 February 1967) is the third son of Mexican composer Julián Carrillo Trujillo, and younger brother of Antonio Carrillo Flores. He did his first studies in Mexico City and he continued them in New York City. On his return to Mexico, he made his studies of preparatory and those of civil engineering at the National University (UNAM), where he graduated in 1932 and became a civil engineer 1939. He received a Guggenheim Fellowship in 1940, and his PhD from Harvard University, where he had also received his MSc in 1941. He taught and did scientific research at UNAM. He represented Mexico in the atomic test of the atoll of Bikini in 1946. He was named technical advisor of the Mexican delegation in the Commission on Atomic Energy of the United Nations for the pacific use of atomic energy.

He was rector of the UNAM from February 14, 1953 to February 13, 1957, and reelected for a second period, the first reelection in UNAM's history, from that same date to January 13, 1961. During his administration the transfer of the university that was scattered around the city to Ciudad Universitaria was carried out, acquired the Van de Graaff equipment, the first one in Latin America for atomic studies, and the publication of the Newspaper of the university began.

He promoted the Nuclear Center of Mexico that would be inaugurated after his death and was executive advisor of the National Commission of Nuclear Energy. From 1943 it was dedicated to the study of the scientific problems of the movements of the subsoil in the Valley of Mexico. He received the National Prize of Sciences in 1957 and among other foreign distinctions, the Legion of Honor of France. He received Doctor Honoris Causa by several national and foreign universities.

Carrillo died in Mexico City on 1967. In 1975, his body was placed next to his father's, in the Rotonda de los Hombres Ilustres (the Rotunda of the Illustrious) of the Panteón de Dolores in Mexico City.

The lunar crater Carrillo is named after him.
