= Karl Heun =

German mathematician (1859–1929)

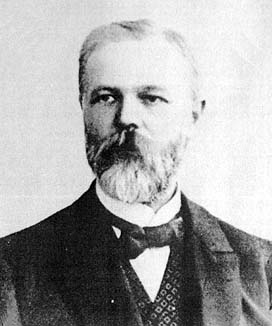
thumd

Karl Heun (German: [ˌkaʁl ˈhɔʏn]; 3 April 1859, Wiesbaden – 10 January 1929, Karlsruhe) was a German mathematician who introduced Heun's equation, Heun functions, and Heun's method.

Karl Heun studied mathematics and philosophy at the University of Göttingen, and briefly at the University of Halle). In 1881, with the dissertation Die Kugelfunktionen und Laméschen Funktionen als Determinanten he received his doctorate under Schering at the University of Göttingen. He then worked as a teacher at an agricultural college in Wehlau, until in 1883 he immigrated to England where he taught until 1885 in Uppingham.

He completed his studies in London and received his Habilitierung qualification in June 1886 at the Ludwig-Maximilians-Universität München with the thesis Über lineare Differentialgleichungen zweiter Ordnung, deren Lösungen durch den Kettenbruchalgorithmus verknüpft sind. From 1886 to 1889, he taught at the Ludwig-Maximilians-Universität München, but due to financial circumstances from 1890 to 1902, he had to work as a teacher in Berlin.

In 1900, Karl Heun received the title of Professor and then in 1902 he obtained the professorial chair of theoretical mechanics at the Technische Hochschule Karlsruhe, where he worked until he retired with a pension in 1922.
