= John Monroe Van Vleck =

American mathematician and astronomer (1833–1912)

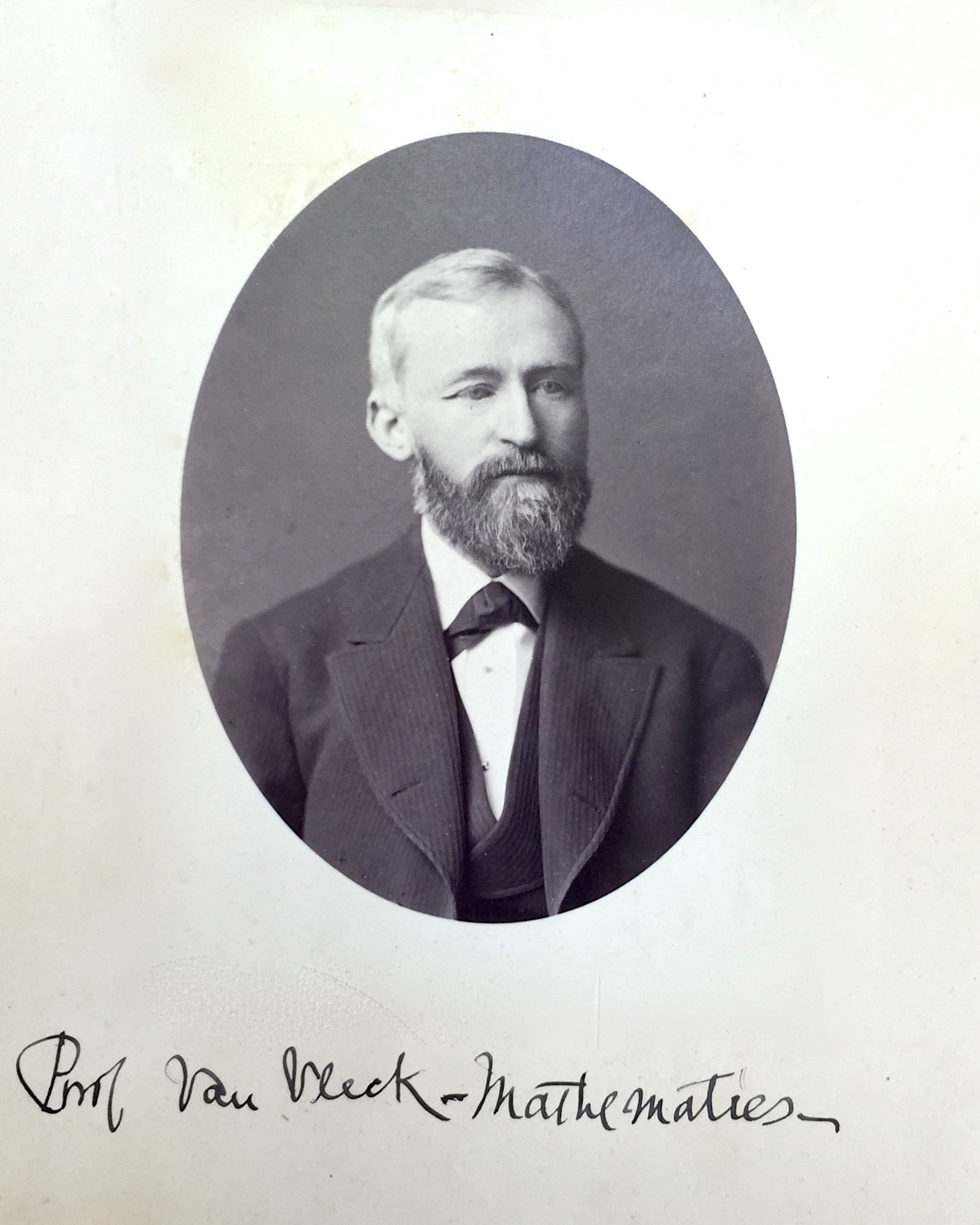
- Van Vleck in 1875
- Born: March 4, 1833; Stone Ridge, New York, U.S.
- Died: November 4, 1912 (aged 79); Middletown, Connecticut, U.S.
- Education: Wesleyan University; Northwestern University (LLD)
- Known for: Van Vleck lunar crater; Van Vleck Observatory
- Spouse: Ellen Maria Burr (m. 1854; died 1899)
- Children: 4, including Edward
- Relatives: John Hasbrouck Van Vleck (grandson)
- Scientific career
- Fields: Mathematics; astronomy
- Workplaces: Wesleyan University; Nautical Almanac Office

John Monroe Van Vleck (March 4, 1833 – November 4, 1912) was an American mathematician and astronomer. He taught astronomy and mathematics at Wesleyan University for more than fifty years and served as the university's acting president twice. The Van Vleck Observatory at Wesleyan University and the lunar crater Van Vleck are named after him.

== Early life ==
John Monroe Van Vleck was born on March 4, 1833, in Stone Ridge, New York, the son of Peter Van Vleck and Ann Hasbrouck. He graduated from Wesleyan University in 1850 and began teaching at Greenwich Academy. He received an LL.D. from Northwestern University in 1876. He was an assistant at the Nautical Almanac Office from 1851 to 1853.

== Career ==
He taught astronomy and mathematics at Wesleyan University in Middletown, Connecticut, from 1853 to 1912, serving as adjunct professor of Mathematics from 1853 to 1857, professor of Mathematics and Astronomy from 1858 to 1904, and professor emeritus from 1904 to 1912. He served as the acting president for the university on two occasions, first from 1872 to 1873 and then from 1887 to 1889. He was also the vice president from 1890 to 1893.

He was a member of the Connecticut Academy of Arts and Sciences. In 1869, he was a member of the Solar Eclipse Expedition to Mount Pleasant, Iowa. He was a fellow of the American Association for the Advancement of Science. He was vice president of the American Mathematical Society in 1904. The Van Vleck Observatory at Wesleyan University was named after him, as was the crater Van Vleck on the Moon.

== Personal life and death ==
John Monroe Van Vleck was married to Ellen Maria Burr on May 2, 1854. She died on December 26, 1899. He died on November 4, 1912, in his home in Middletown, Connecticut, after a brief illness. They were survived by a son and three daughters: Edward, Anna, Clara, and Jane.

Edward was a leading mathematician in the United States and taught at the University of Wisconsin–Madison, where he became professor emeritus in 1926. Edward's son, John Hasbrouck Van Vleck, was a physicist and mathematician who won the Nobel Prize in Physics in 1977. John Monroe, Edward, and John Hasbrouck Van Vleck are related to the software engineer Tom Van Vleck, who co-authored an early email program.
