= Grove Karl Gilbert =

American geologist (1843–1918)

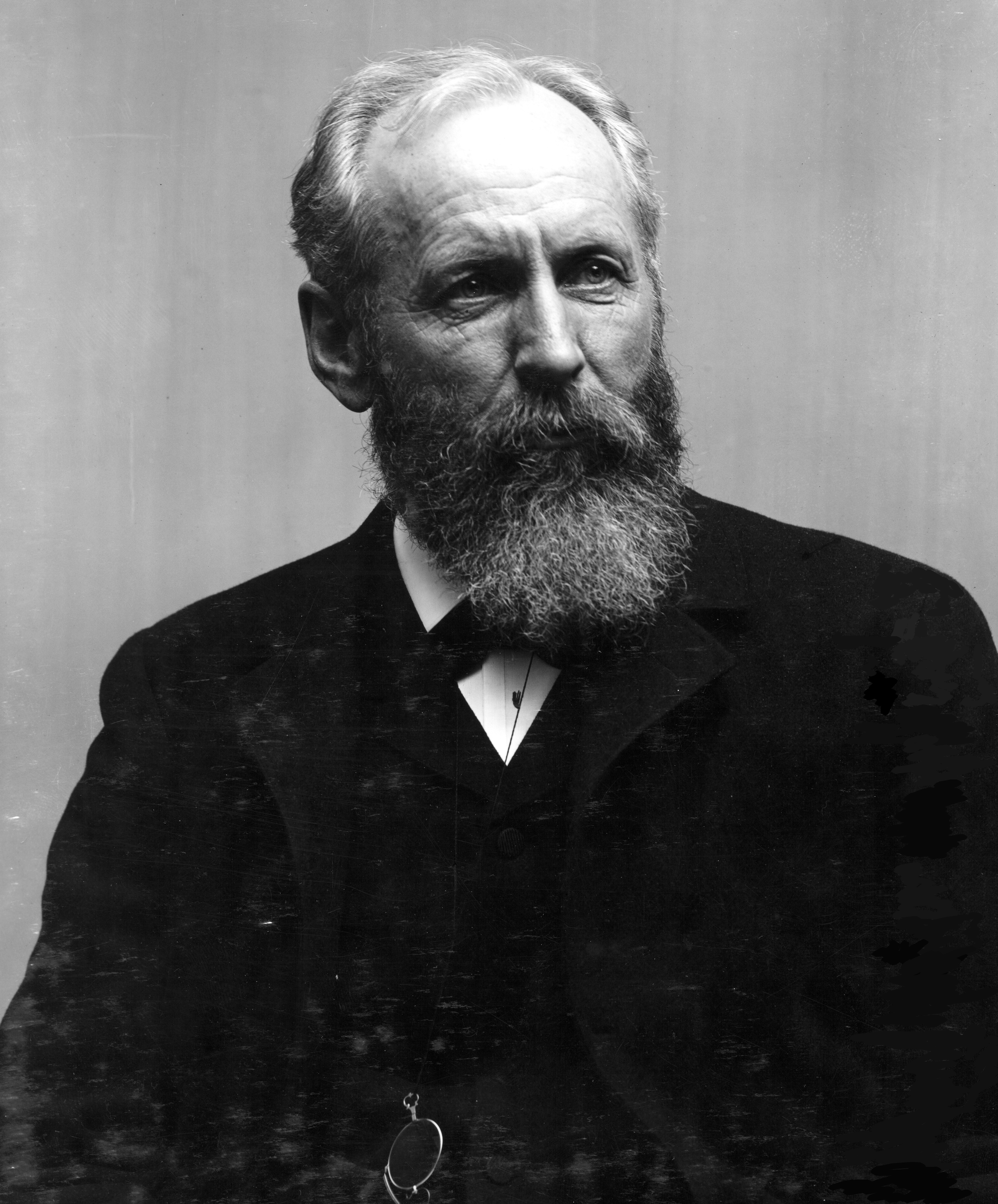
- Born: May 6, 1843; Rochester, New York, U.S.
- Died: May 1, 1918 (aged 74); Jackson, Michigan, U.S.
- Education: University of Rochester
- Known for: Gilbert delta Crater studies Epeirogenic movement Geology of the Rocky Mountains; Cycle of erosion
- Awards: Wollaston Medal (1900); Charles P. Daly Medal (1910)
- Scientific career
- Fields: Geology

Grove Karl Gilbert (May 6, 1843 – May 1, 1918), known by the abbreviated name G. K. Gilbert in academic literature, was an American geologist.

== Biography ==
Gilbert was born in Rochester, New York, the youngest of three kids of the painter Grove Sheldon Gilbert, and his wife, Eliza. He graduated from the University of Rochester. During the American Civil War, he was twice listed for the draft, but his name was drawn neither time. In 1871, he joined George M. Wheeler's geographical survey as its first geologist.

=== Rockies geologist ===
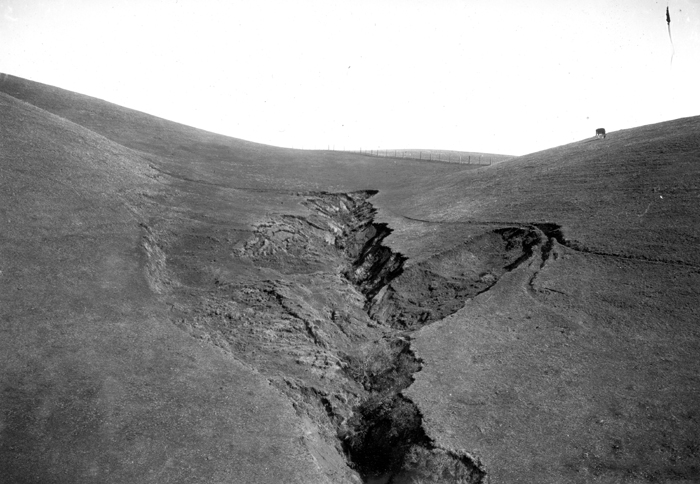
Headward erosion of a gully; photo by G.K. Gilbert

Gilbert joined the Powell Survey of the Rocky Mountain Region in 1874, becoming Powell's primary assistant, and stayed with the survey until 1879. During this time he published an important monograph, The Geology of the Henry Mountains (1877). After the U.S. Geological Survey was created in 1879, he was appointed to the position of Senior Geologist and worked for the USGS until his death (including a term as acting director).

Gilbert published a study of the former ancient Lake Bonneville in 1890 (the lake existed during the Pleistocene), of which the Great Salt Lake is a remnant. He named it after the army captain Benjamin Bonneville, who had explored the region. The type of river delta that Gilbert described at this location has since become known to geomorphologists as a Gilbert delta.

=== Meteor crater ===
In 1891, Gilbert examined the origins of a crater in Arizona, now known as Meteor Crater but then as Coon Butte. For several reasons, and against his intuition, he concluded it was the result of a volcanic steam explosion rather than an impact of a meteorite. Gilbert based his conclusion on the beliefs that the volume of an impact crater including the meteorite should be more than the ejected material on the rim and that, if it was a meteorite, iron should create magnetic anomalies. Gilbert's calculations showed that the crater's volume and the debris on the rim were roughly equal, and that there were no magnetic anomalies. He argued that the meteorite fragments found on the rim were just "coincidence". In 1892, Gilbert delivered his paper "The Moon's Face; A Study of the Origin of Its Features" as his retiring President's lecture to the Philosophical Society of Washington, and it was published in the Society's bulletin. He publicized these conclusions in a series of lectures in 1895. Later investigations revealed that it was in fact a meteor crater, but that interpretation was not well established until the mid-20th century. As part of his interest in crater origins, Gilbert also studied the moon's craters and concluded they were caused by impact events rather than volcanoes, although he wondered why the craters were round and not oval as expected for an oblique impact. The interpretation of lunar craters as of impact origin was also debated until the mid-20th century.

== Geomorphology ==
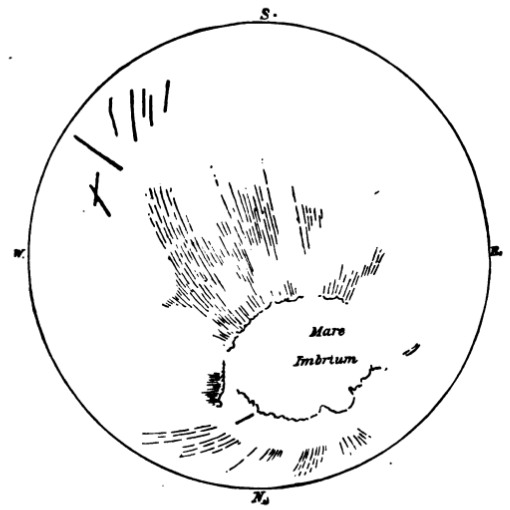
Gilbert's 1893 drawing of sculpture around Mare Imbrium

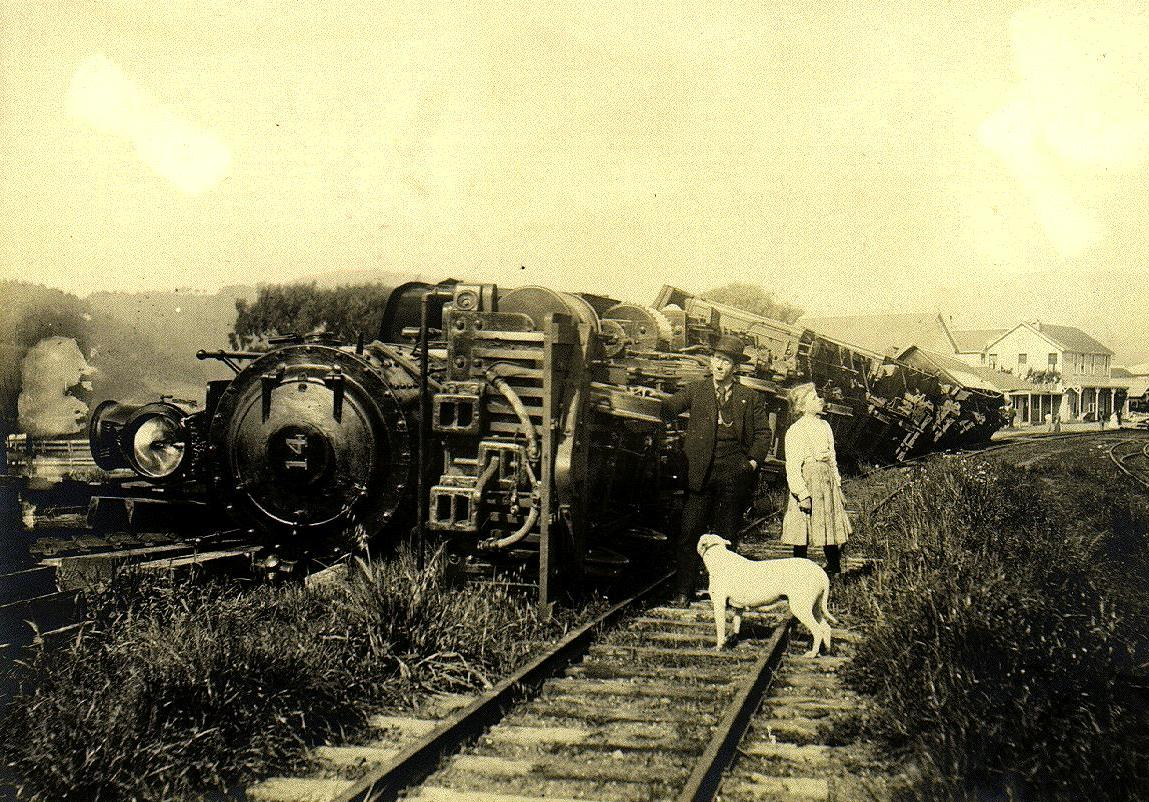
Derailed train after the 1906 San Francisco earthquake; photo by G.K. Gilbert

Gilbert joined the Harriman Alaska Expedition in 1899. Two weeks after the 1906 San Francisco earthquake, he took a series of photographs documenting the damage along the San Andreas fault from Inverness to Bolinas.

Gilbert is considered one of the giants of the subdiscipline of geomorphology, having contributed to the understanding of landscape evolution, erosion, river incision, and sedimentation. He was a planetary science pioneer, correctly identifying lunar craters as caused by impacts, and carrying out early impact-cratering experiments. He coined the term sculpture for a pattern of radial ridges surrounding Mare Imbrium on the moon, and correctly interpreted them in 1892 as ejecta from a giant impact. Gilbert was one of the more influential early American geologists.

== Awards ==
He won the Wollaston Medal from the Geological Society of London in 1900. He was elected as a member to the American Philosophical Society in 1902. He was awarded the Charles P. Daly Medal by the American Geographical Society in 1910. Gilbert was well-esteemed by all American geologists during his lifetime, and he is the only geologist to ever be elected twice as President of the Geological Society of America (1892 and 1909). Because of Gilbert's prescient insights into planetary geology, the Geological Society of America created the G.K. Gilbert Award for planetary geology in 1983. Gilbert's wide-ranging scientific ideas were so profound that the Geological Society of America published GSA Special Paper 183 on his research (Yochelson, E.L., editor, 1980, The Scientific Ideas of G.K. Gilbert, fourteen separate biographical chapters, 148 pages). Gilbert also served as the president of the American Society of Naturalists from 1885 to 1886.

Craters on the moon and on Mars are named in his honor, as is Mount Gilbert in Alaska, a second Mount Gilbert in California, and Gilbert Peak in the Uinta Mountains of Utah.

== Publications ==
- "Report on the geology of the Henry mountains (1877)
- "Lake Bonneville" US Geological Survey Monograph No. 1. 1890. 438 p.
- "The Moon's face: a study of the origin of its features". Bulletin of the Philosophical Society of Washington (January 1893).
- "The Underground Water of the Arkansas Valley in Eastern Colorado" (1896)
- "Harriman Alaska Expedition, Volume 3: Glaciers and glaciation (1899)
- "The San Francisco Earthquake and Fire of April 18, 1906, and Their Effects on Structures and ..." (1907)
- "The transportation of débris by running water" US Geological Survey Professional Paper No. 86 (1914)
- "Bolinas" USGS photographs of San Andreas fault taken by Gilbert (1906)
- "Studies of Basin-Range structure" U.S. Geological Survey Professional Paper 153 (1928)

== See also ==
- Gilbert (lunar crater)
- Gilbert (Martian crater)
- G. K. Gilbert Award of the Geological Society of America

== Secondary sources ==
- Pyne, Stephen J. Grove Karl Gilbert: A Great Engine of Research. Austin: University of Texas Press, 1980.
