= Friedrich von Schubert =

Russian general (1789–1865)

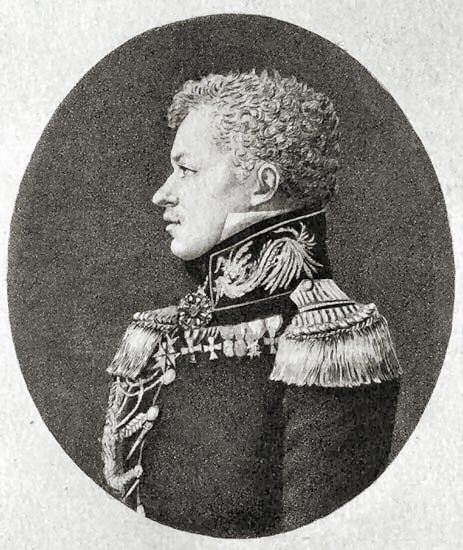
- Friedrich Theodor Schubert (1838)
- Born: 1789; Saint Petersburg, Russian Empire
- Died: 1865 (aged 75–76); Stuttgart, Württemberg

Theodor Friedrich von Schubert (1789–1865) was a Russian general and scientist of Baltic German descent.

== Biography ==
He was born in Saint Petersburg as the son of astronomer Theodor von Schubert. When he was sixteen years old, he accompanied his father on the Russian expedition to China.

He was married to Sophie Rall, and had four children: Yelizaveta, Alexandrine, Sophie and Theodor. The great mathematician, Sofya Kovalevskaya (daughter of Yelizaveta), was his granddaughter.

He became an infantry general in the Russian army, head of the military topographic service, and honorary member of the Russian Academy of Sciences. As an officer, he fought in the War of the Fourth Coalition in 1806, in the Finnish War in 1808 and in the Russo-Turkish War in 1810. By 1812, he was an upper quartermaster general, and at the battle of Leipzig in 1813, he became a colonel. Between 1815 and 1818, he stayed with the Russian occupation force in France, before returning to Russia as part of the general staff. He was interested in cartography. In 1845, he became an infantry general.

He died in Stuttgart in 1865, after having spent his last years traveling.

The lunar crater Schubert is named after him.

== Bibliography ==
- Unter dem Doppeladler, his memoirs, first published in 1962

== Sources ==
- "Шуберт, Федор Федорович" . Brockhaus and Efron Encyclopedic Dictionary (in Russian). 1906.
- Biography from Pierer's Universal-Lexikon, 4th edition 1857–1865 (in German)
- Friedrich von Schubert Moon Crater
