= Heine–Stieltjes polynomials =

In mathematics, the Heine–Stieltjes polynomials or Stieltjes polynomials, introduced by T. J. Stieltjes, are polynomial solutions of a second-order Fuchsian equation, a differential equation all of whose singularities are regular. The Fuchsian equation has the form

$$\frac{d^2 S}{dz^2}+\left(\sum _{j=1}^N \frac{\gamma _j}{z - a_j} \right) \frac{dS}{dz} + \frac{V(z)}{\prod _{j=1}^N (z - a_j)}S = 0$$

for some polynomial V(z) of degree at most N − 2, and if this has a polynomial solution S then V is called a Van Vleck polynomial (after Edward Burr Van Vleck) and S is called a Heine–Stieltjes polynomial.

Heun polynomials are the special cases of Stieltjes polynomials when the differential equation has four singular points.
