= Schubert (lunar crater) =

Lunar crater

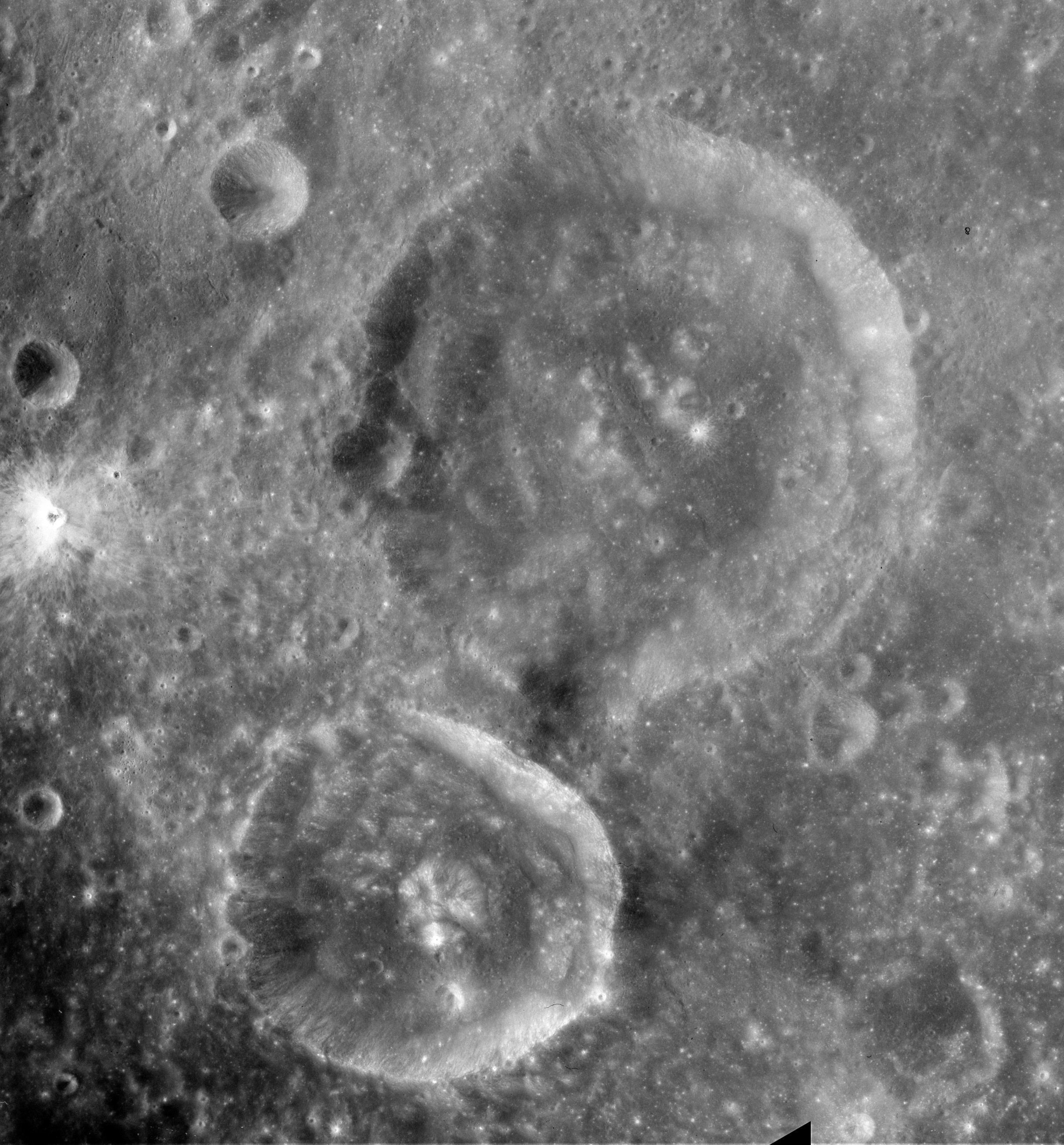
- Apollo 16 Mapping Camera image of Schubert crater (above right of center) and Back crater (below left of center)
- Coordinates: 2.8°N 81.0°E
- Diameter: 54 km
- Depth: 3.35 km
- Colongitude: 280° at sunrise
- Eponym: Theodor F. von Schubert

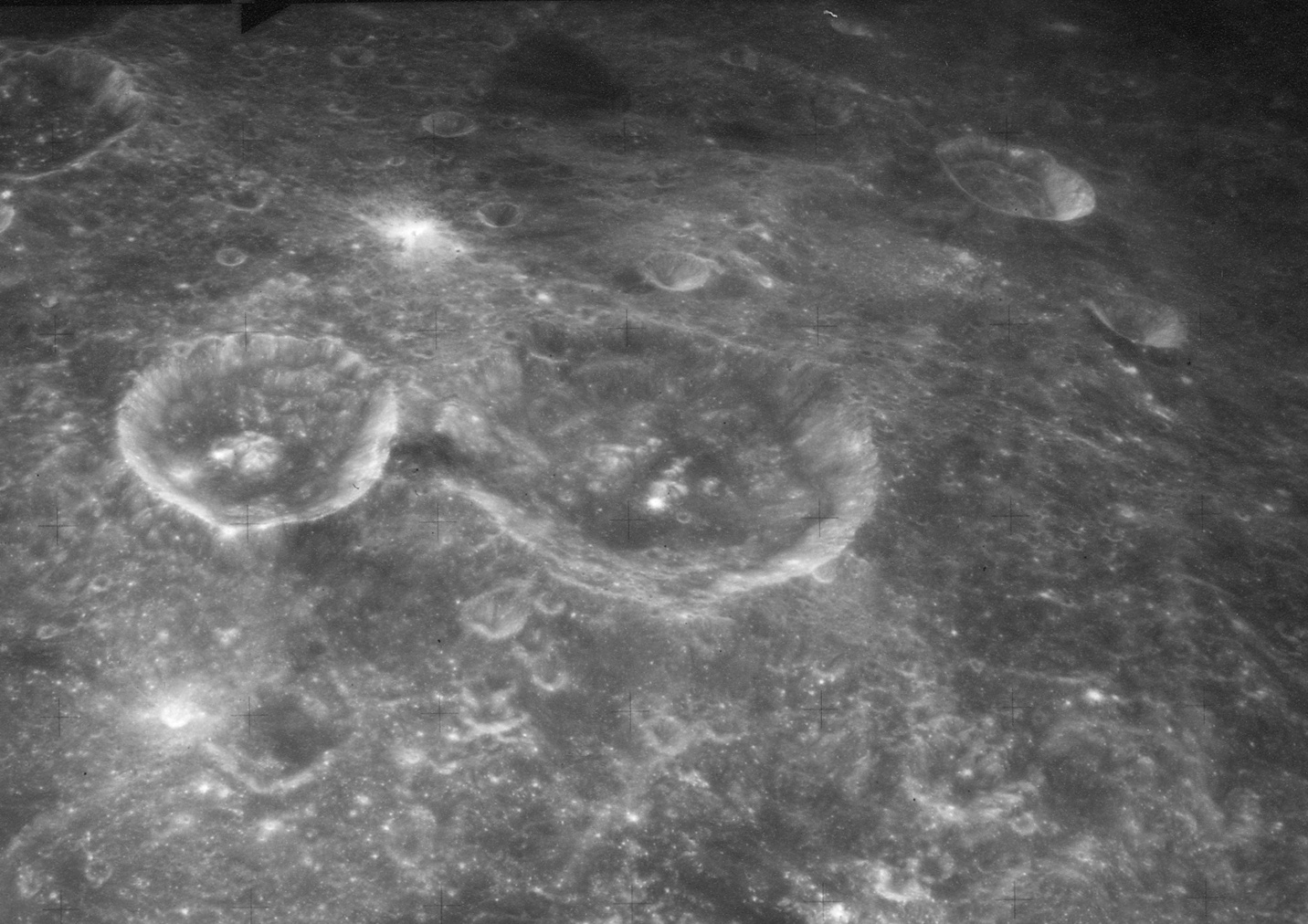
Oblique view of Schubert and vicinity, facing west, from Apollo 15

Schubert is a lunar impact crater that lies near the eastern limb of the Moon's near side. It is located northwest of the Mare Smythii, and southwest of the prominent crater Neper. Nearly attached to the southern rim is the crater Back.

Schubert is a nearly circular crater formation that has not suffered significant erosion from subsequent impacts, and retains a well-defined rim. The interior surface is generally flat, with a few low hills near the center.

== Satellite craters ==
By convention these features are identified on lunar maps by placing the letter on the side of the crater midpoint that is closest to Schubert.

Schubert	Latitude	Longitude	Diameter
A	2.1° N	79.3° E	2 km
C	1.8° N	84.6° E	31 km
E	4.0° N	78.6° E	27 km
F	3.2° N	77.9° E	35 km
G	4.1° N	75.2° E	56 km
H	1.4° N	76.1° E	31 km
J	0.1° S	78.9° E	20 km
K	2.3° N	75.9° E	29 km
N	1.8° N	72.7° E	75 km
X	0.3° N	76.8° E	51 km

The following craters have been renamed by the IAU.

- Schubert B — See Back (crater).
- Schubert Y — See Nobili (crater).
- Schubert Z — See Jenkins (crater).
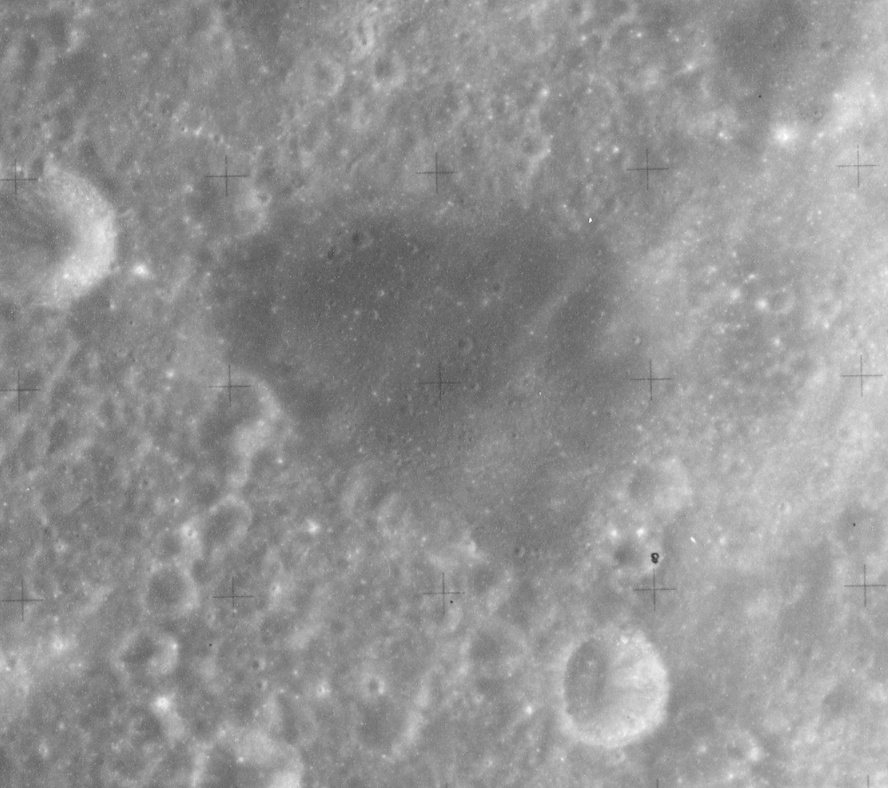
The low-albedo, flat-floored crater Schubert F

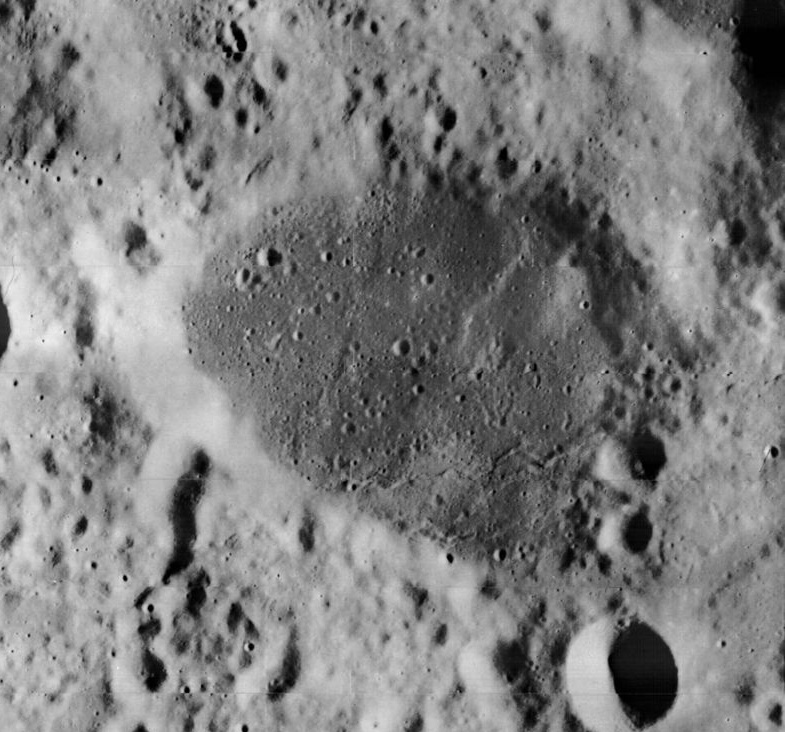
Schubert F from Lunar Orbiter 1

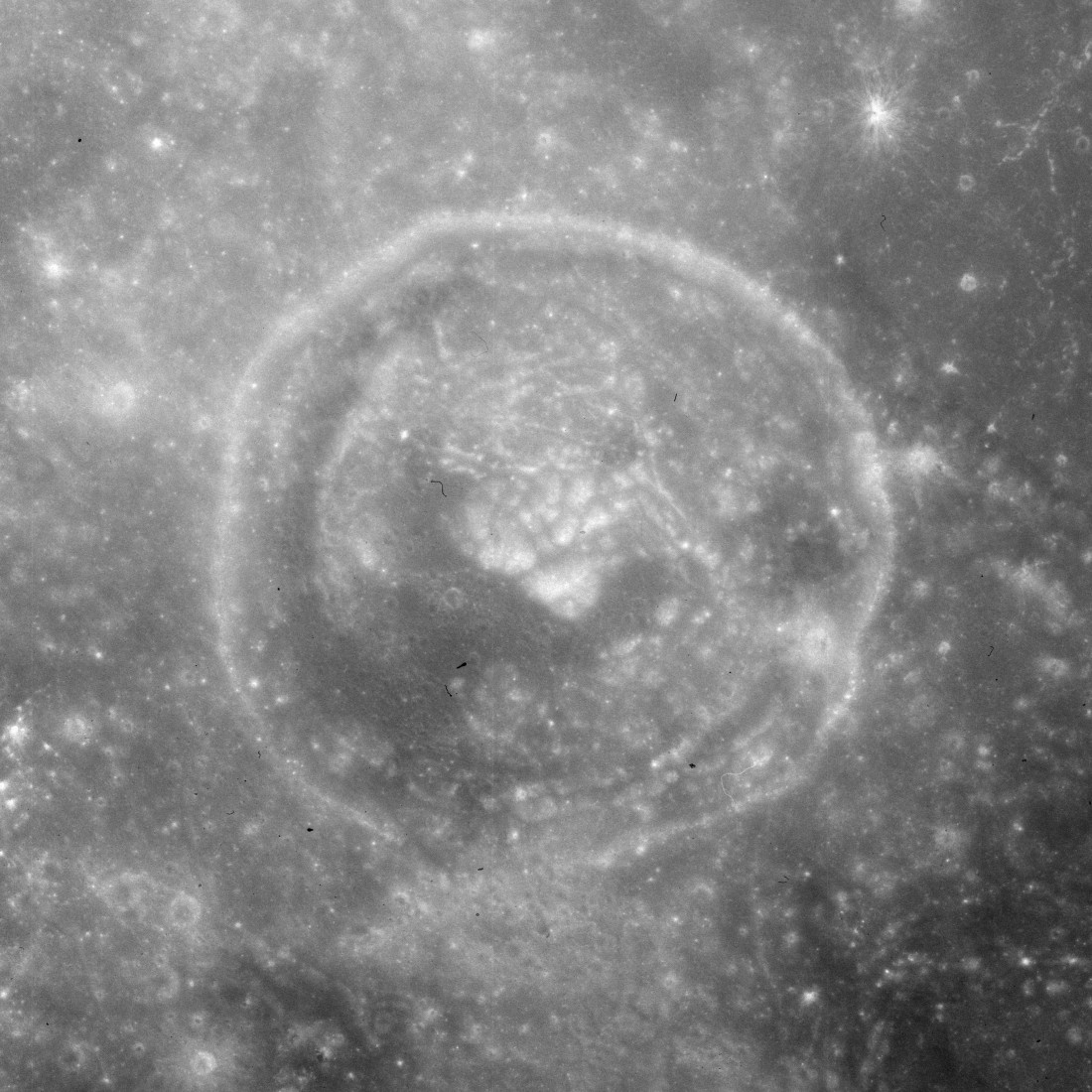
Schubert C, in Mare Smythii

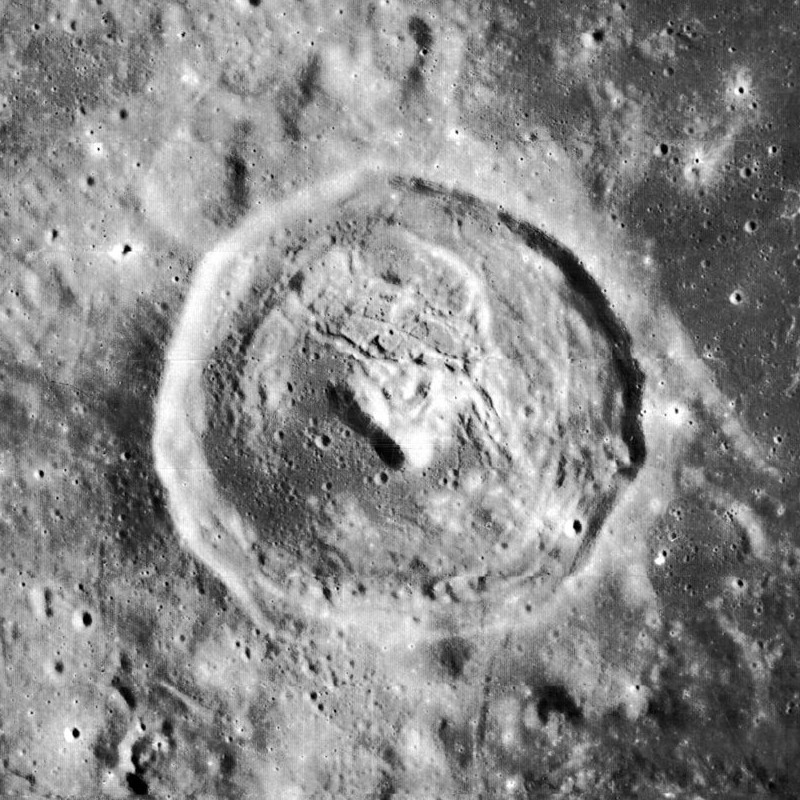
Another view of Schubert C

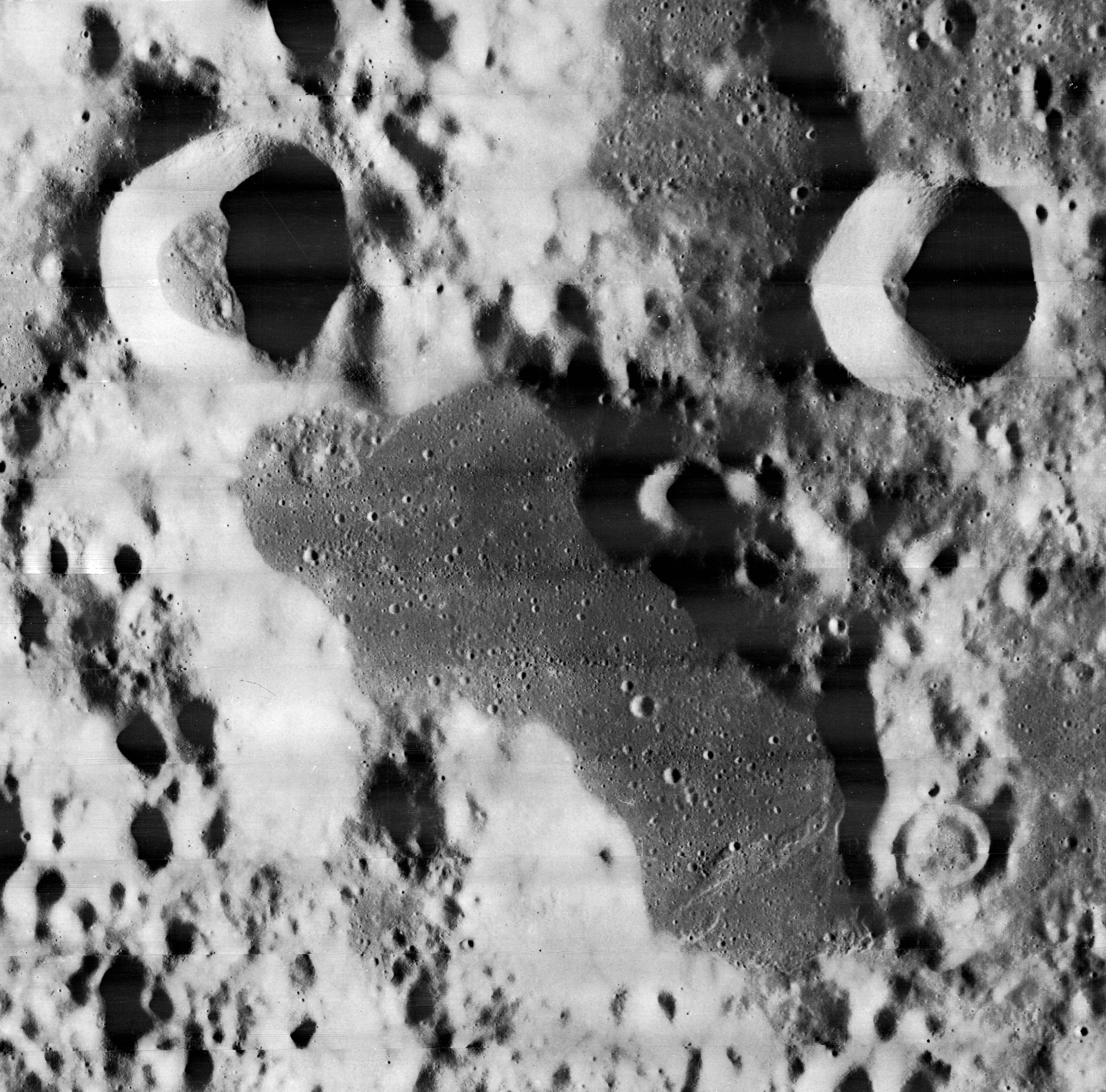
The dark, flat plain at the bottom is Schubert N. At the top are the craters Respighi (upper left) and Liouville (upper right). From Lunar Orbiter 1.

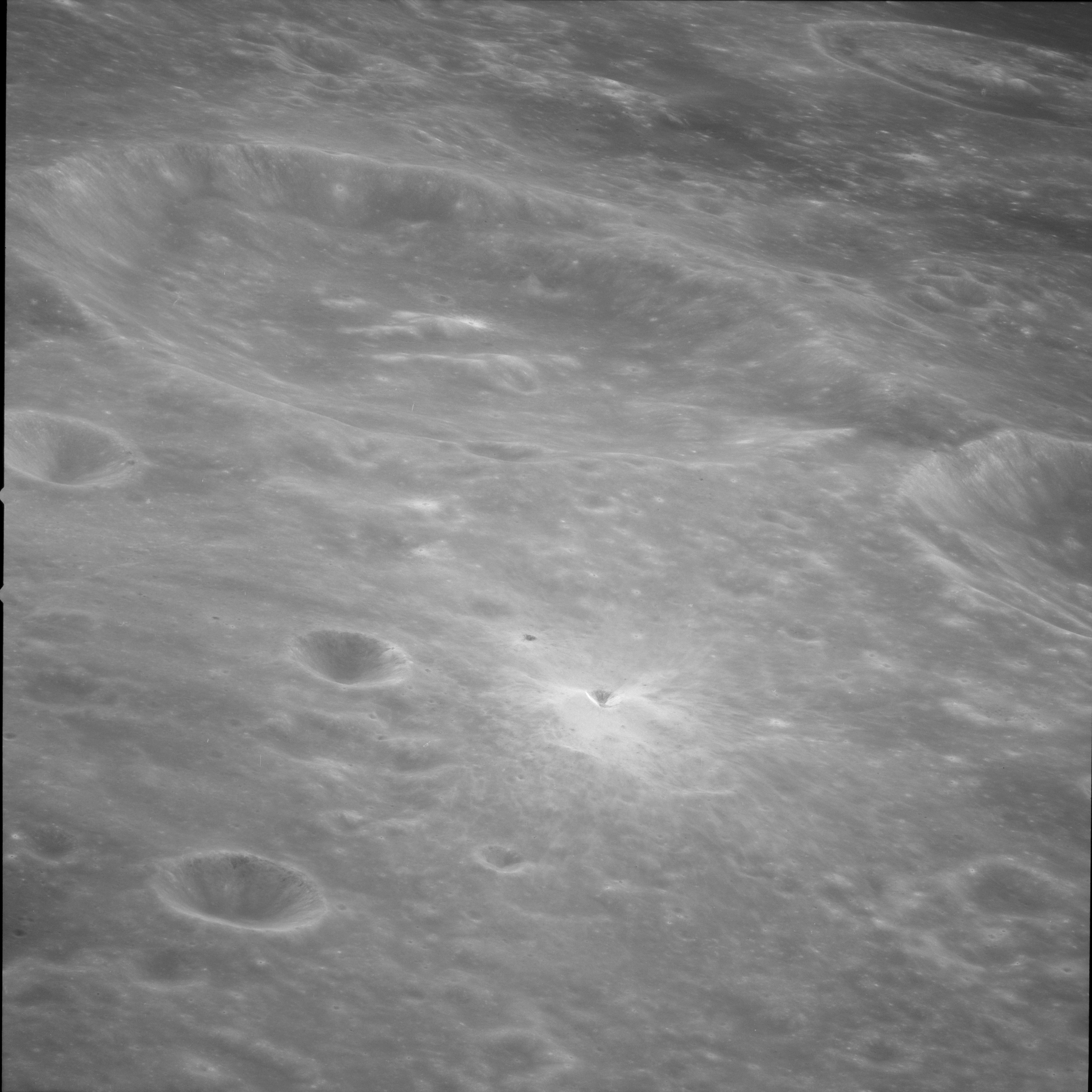
The small bright-rayed crater in this Apollo 11 photo is Schubert A

Schubert C is called Doyle on some older maps, but this name was not approved by the IAU.
