= Wall polynomial =

In mathematics, a Wall polynomial is a polynomial studied by Wall in his work on conjugacy classes in classical groups, and named by George Andrews. Andrews (1984).
