= Van Vleck (crater) =

Crater on the Moon

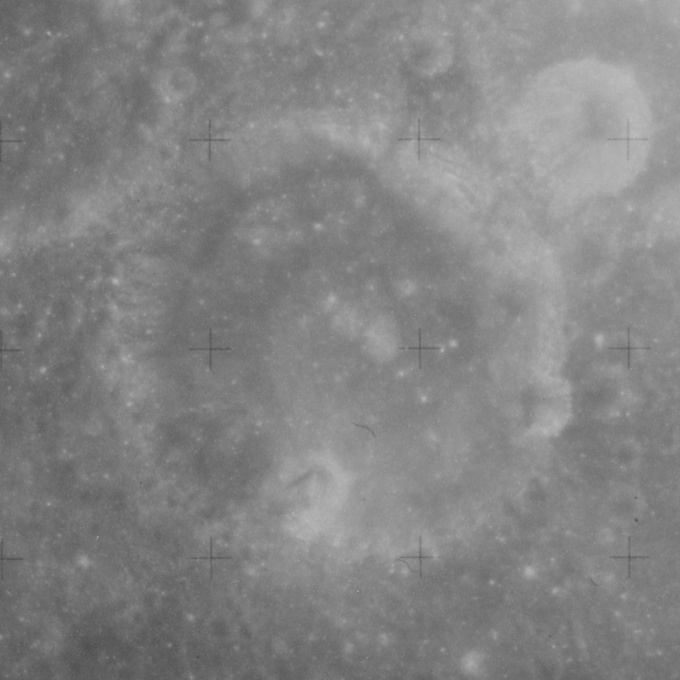
- Apollo 16 Mapping Camera image
- Coordinates: 1.77°S 78.20°E
- Diameter: 33.48 km
- Depth: 3.1 km
- Colongitude: 282° at sunrise
- Eponym: John M. Van Vleck

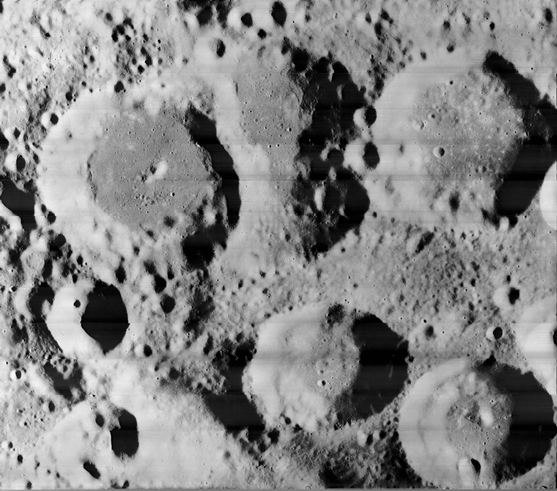
The craters Weierstrass (lower center), Van Vleck (lower right), Nobili (upper left) and Jenkins (upper right) from Lunar Orbiter 1

Van Vleck is a lunar impact crater that is located near the northeastern rim of the walled plain called Gilbert, to the west of the Mare Smythii. The similar crater Weierstrass is nearly joined to the northwestern rim of Van Vleck. To the east is the small Carrillo.

The rim of this crater is nearly circular with no overlying craters of note, although a small crater abuts against the northeastern side and another along the southern inner wall. The inner sides slope down to a slumped ring of unconsolidated material that encircles the interior floor. There is a small peak just to the north of the crater center.

This crater was previously identified as Gilbert M before being assigned a name by the IAU in 1976.
