= Grove Sheldon Gilbert =

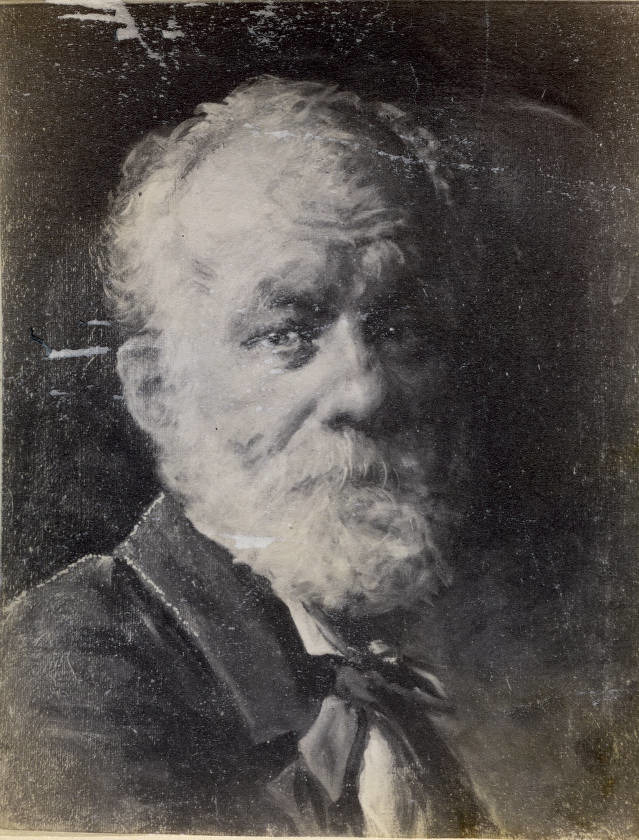
- Self-portrait
- Born: 5 August 1805; Clinton, Oneida County, New York
- Died: 23 March 1885 (aged 79); Rochester, New York
- Education: Middlebury Academy
- Known for: portraiture
- Spouse: Eliza Stanley
- Children: Grove Karl Gilbert

Grove Sheldon Gilbert (August 5, 1805, Clinton - March 23, 1885, Rochester) was an American portrait painter and abolitionist active in the New York state during the 19th century.

== Early life ==
Grove Sheldon Gilbert was born in 1805 to John and Eunice Gilbert (née Barns). His father worked as a blacksmith. In 1813, the family relocated to Buffalo, and following a Buffalo fire of the same year, they settled in Le Roy, New York, where Grove Sheldon received his education at Middlebury Academy. Before deciding to be an artist, he started studying medicine.

== Career ==
At age 20, Grove Sheldon chose to become a painter, and studied portraiture in Philadelphia from 1826 to 1828. Between 1829 and 1830, he taught at Fort Niagara, New York, and painted portraits there. From 1830 to 1834, he traveled to Lewiston and Toronto, among other Canadian towns, producing commissioned portraits.

Following that, he moved to Fort Niagara, N.Y., in 1829, where he taught at school and painted portraits. In 1830 he started a four-year trip over United States and Canada, visiting Lewiston, Toronto and other Canadian towns. In 1834 he moved to Rochester, N.Y., establishing a painting studio where he portrayed many important locals. He remained professionally active there for the rest of his life. Over time, he earned the moniker “the dean of Rochester artists”.

After he was asked to submit a portrait for an exhibition sponsored by the National Academy of Design in New York, he was nominated for honorary membership and accepted in 1848. He also became an honorary member of the Albany Academy of Arts in 1849.

Gilbert was an abolitionist. He claimed he voted once, for himself, in 1848 when the abolitionists nominated him for a state assembly on a separate slate. However, in 1841 he appeared on the nominee list for assessor by the same party. According to Wilbur Henry Siebert, Gilbert used his home as a stop on the Underground Railroad.

Grove Sheldon Gilbert died in Rochester, New York, on March 23, 1885, and was buried in the local Mount Hope Cemetery.

== Personal life ==
He married Eliza Stanley on November 30, 1826 They had three kids: eldest Hiram Roy Gilbert, middle Emma Loomis, and the youngest Grove Karl Gilbert, who became a distinguished American geologist.

Grove Sheldon was initially a Presbyterian, although around the time of Grove Karl's birth, he apostatized. Nevertheless, he still possessed "a deeply religious nature"

== Exhibitions ==
The Rochester Art Club held an exhibition in 1886 featuring "The Gilbert Collection," showcasing 233 of his portraits posthumously. Additionally, the University of Rochester's Memorial Art Gallery preserves 44 black-and-white photographs documenting his work, including a self-portrait and portraits of the family.
