= Theodor von Schubert =

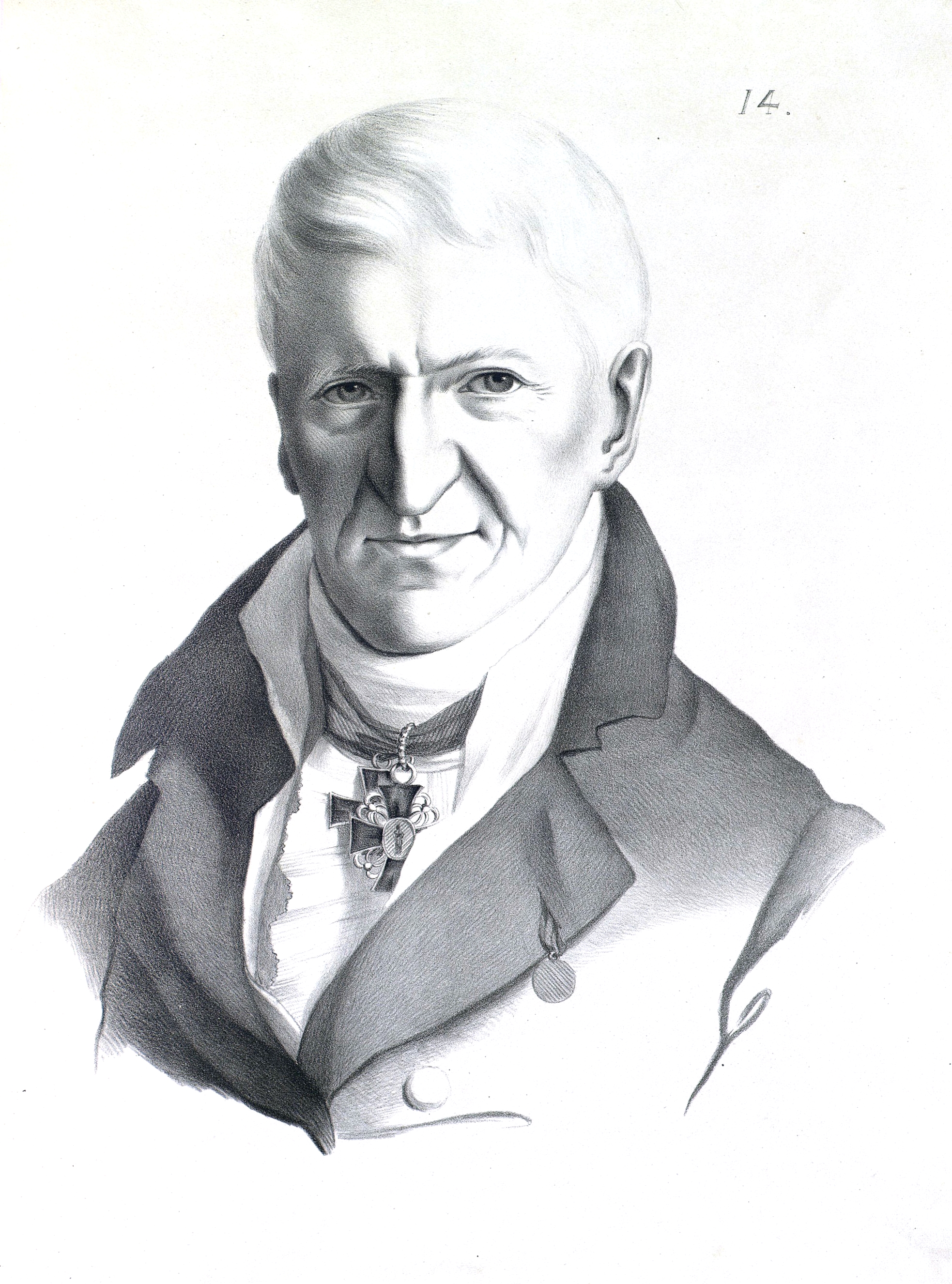
Theodor von Schubert

Friedrich Theodor von Schubert (30 October 1758 – 21 October 1825) was a German astronomer and geographer.

== Life and works ==
Born in Helmstedt, his father, Johann Ernst Schubert, was a professor of theology and abbot of Michaelstein Abbey. Theodor likewise studied theology, but didn't like it. He traveled abroad, first to Sweden in 1779. He then went to Bartelshagen, where he became the tutor of the children of Major von Cronhelm. Since the major was fond of mathematics and astronomy, Theodor had to study these himself to be able to teach those subjects. He then married the daughter of the major, Luise Friederike von Cronhelm. Afterwards, he traveled to Tallinn in Estonia, again as a house teacher. He moved on to Haapsalu, teaching mathematics to young noblemen as a preparation for a life as an officer. In 1785 he became an assistant of the Russian Academy of Sciences as a geographer, and by June 1789 he was a full member. In 1803, he became head of the astronomical observatory of the Academy. In 1805, he was a member of the failed Russian expedition to China, together with his son. He was elected a Foreign Honorary Member of the American Academy of Arts and Sciences in 1812.

He not only produced some scientific works, but also helped popularize astronomy. Between 1788 and 1825, he published the St. Petersburger Kalender, and between 1808 and 1818 the St. Petersburger astronomischen Taschenkalender. He also wrote for the newspapers and for the German language St. Petersburger Zeitung, which he edited from 1810 until his death.

His son Theodor Friedrich von Schubert was a general in the Russian army and explorer and after whom the lunar crater Schubert is named.

== Bibliography ==
- Populäre Astronomie. 3 volumes, Petersburg (1808–10)
- Theoretische Astronomie. 3 volumes, Petersburg 1798. Translated in French as Traite d'astronomie theorique, published in 1834 by Perthes & Besser.
- Astronomische Bestimmung der Längen u. Breiten. Petersburg 1806 (reprinted, and translated in Russian)
- Geschichte der Astronomie. Petersburg 1804
- Vermischte Schriften. 7 volumes, Tübingen 1823–26 (4 volumes) and Leipzig 1840 (3 volumes).

== Sources ==
- "Шуберт, Федор Иванович" . Brockhaus and Efron Encyclopedic Dictionary (in Russian). 1906.
- Biography from Pierer's Universal-Lexikon, 4th edition 1857–1865 (in German)
- Biography from the Allgemeine Deutsche Biographie, 1891 (in German, at Wikisource)
