= Gilbert (lunar crater) =

Crater on the Moon

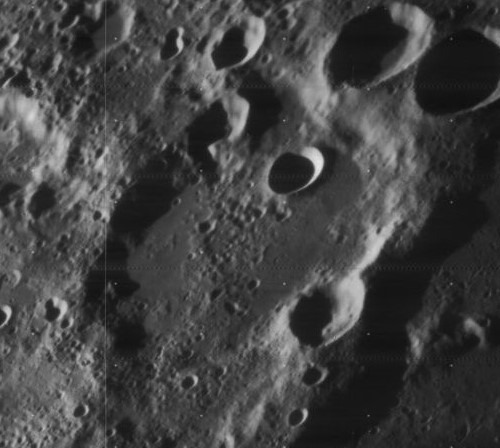
- Oblique Lunar Orbiter 4 image
- Coordinates: 3.20°S 76.16°E
- Diameter: 100.25 km
- Depth: 1.7 km
- Colongitude: 285° at sunrise
- Eponym: Grove K. Gilbert; William Gilbert

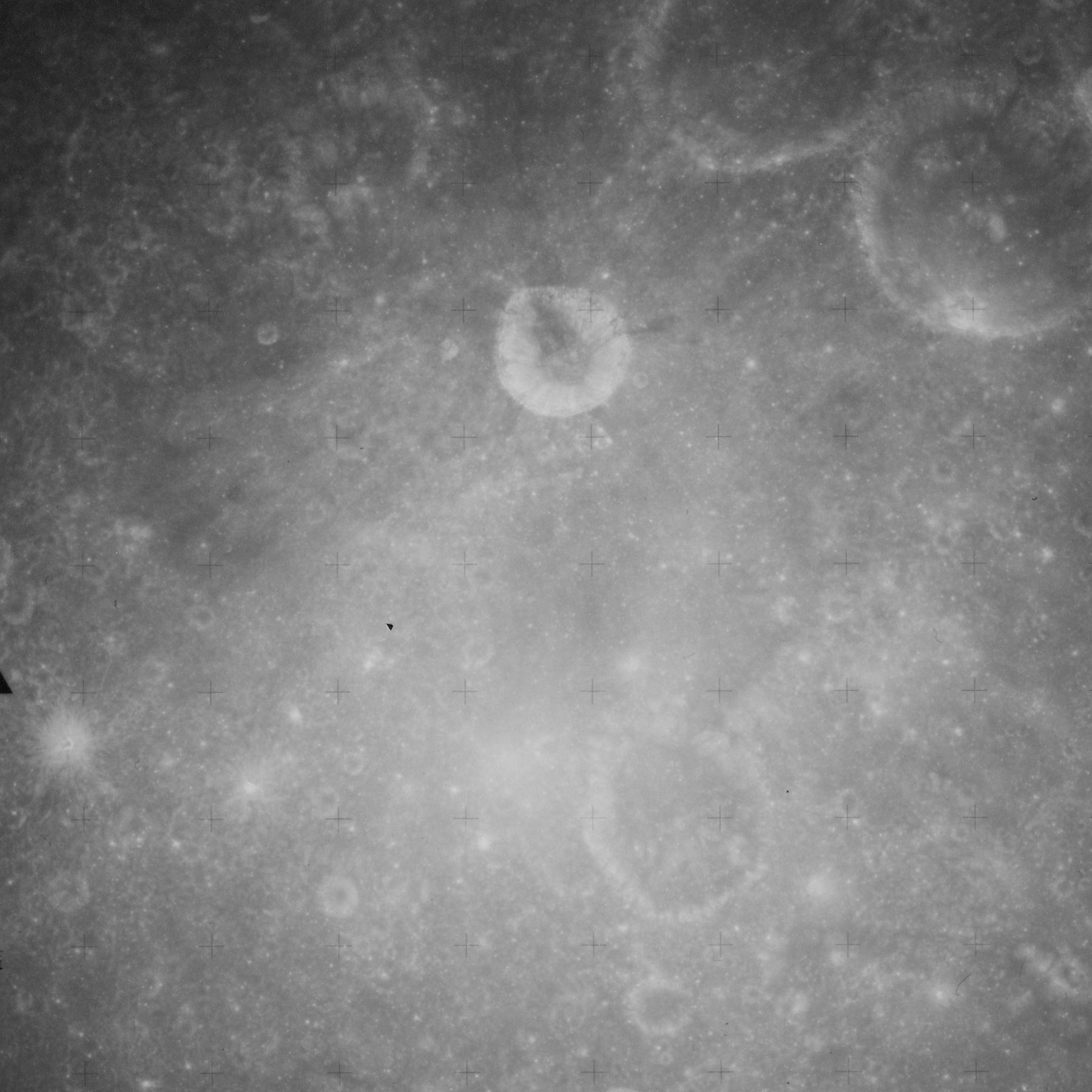
Gilbert, from Apollo 16. At this high sun angle, the eroded rim of the crater is barely distinguishable. Geissler is the small but prominent crater above center.

Gilbert is a large lunar impact crater that lies near the eastern limb of the Moon. Due to its location this feature appears foreshortened when viewed from the Earth, limiting the amount of detail that can be observed. The crater lies to the northwest of a similar-sized walled plain called Kästner, to the west of the Mare Smythii.

Several satellite craters in the vicinity have since been given names by the IAU. Nearly attached to the north-northeastern rim of Gilbert are the craters Weierstrass (Gilbert N) and Van Vleck (Gilbert M), two somewhat similar formations. In the northeastern part of Gilbert's interior floor is the small, bowl-shaped Geissler (Gilbert D).

Gilbert is a somewhat degraded walled plain, with an outer rim that has been somewhat reshaped by nearby impacts. The southern rim has almost completely disintegrated, and forms a rolling surface that flows toward the south as an extended depression. The crater pair of Weierstrass and Van Vleck has formed an indented rim along the northeast face, while the northwest rim is overlain by Gilbert S. The interior floor is relatively level with some low ridges running down the center toward the southern end.

Having a highly eroded rim, estimating the depth of Gilbert is somewhat arbitrary, but topographic data obtained during the Apollo missions allows estimation of a depth of at least 1.7 km around most of the rim.

This crater is named after American geologist Grove K. Gilbert (1843–1918) and English natural philosopher William Gilbert (c. 1544–1603). The crater's name was approved by the IAU in 1964.

== Satellite craters ==
By convention these features are identified on lunar maps by placing the letter on the side of the crater midpoint that is closest to Gilbert.

Gilbert	Latitude	Longitude	Diameter
J	4.3° S	72.7° E	38 km
K	5.5° S	73.2° E	38 km
P	0.9° S	75.6° E	18 km
S	1.9° S	75.6° E	19 km
V	1.5° S	79.9° E	15 km
W	1.1° S	78.9° E	19 km

The following craters have been renamed by the IAU.

- Gilbert D — See Geissler.
- Gilbert M — See Van Vleck.
- Gilbert N — See Weierstrass.
- Gilbert U — See Avery.
