= Carrillo (crater) =

Crater on the Moon

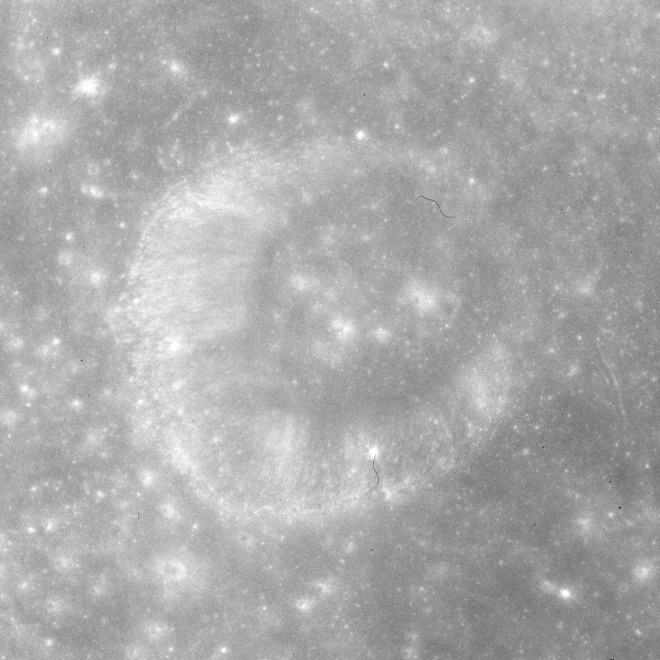
- Apollo 16 Mapping Camera image
- Coordinates: 2.11°S 80.96°E
- Diameter: 17.85 km (11.09 mi)
- Depth: 2.5 km (1.6 mi)
- Colongitude: 278° at sunrise
- Eponym: N. Carrillo Flores

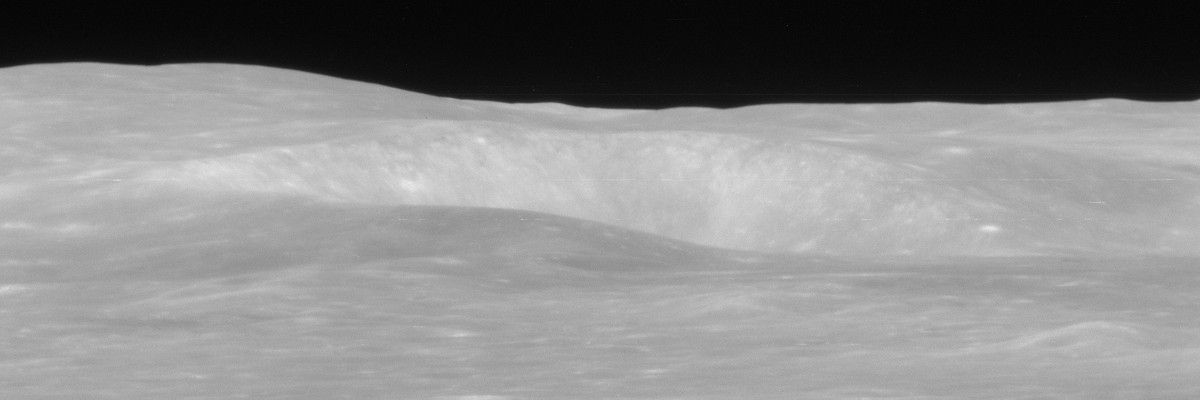
Oblique view from Apollo 17

Carrillo is a small lunar impact crater located near the eastern limb of the Moon. In this location the crater is subject to lunar libration effects, and appears highly oval due to foreshortening. It is located on the slope of highlands on the west side of Mare Smythii, to the south of the smaller crater Avery. This is a bowl-shaped feature with an inner wall that is widest on the western side, growing smaller toward the east where it is barely a low ridge next to the mare.

This formation is named after Mexican civil engineer N. Carrillo Flores (1911-1967). Its designation was formally approved by the International Astronomical Union in 1979.
