= Weierstrass (crater) =

Crater on the Moon

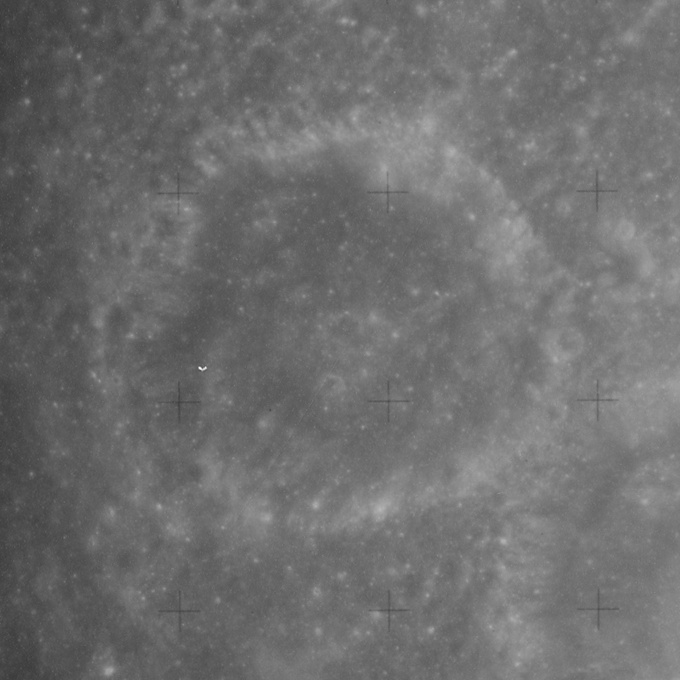
- Apollo 16 Mapping Camera image
- Coordinates: 1.26°S 77.15°E
- Diameter: 31.32 km
- Depth: 2.8 km
- Colongitude: 283° at sunrise
- Eponym: Karl Weierstrass

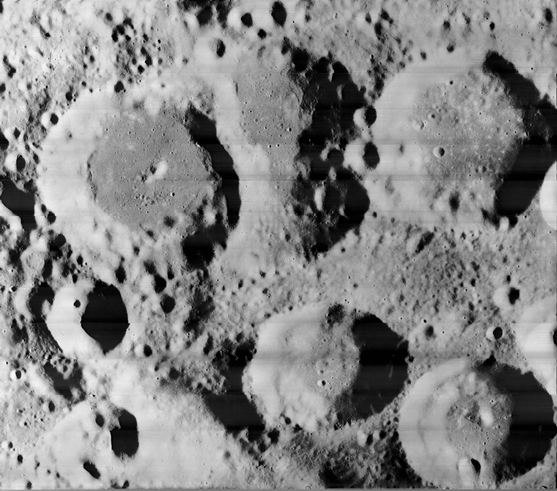
The craters Weierstrass (lower center), Van Vleck (lower right), Nobili (upper left) and Jenkins (upper right) from Lunar Orbiter 1

Weierstrass is a small lunar impact crater that is attached to the northern rim of the walled plain named Gilbert, in the eastern part of the Moon. It also lies very near the crater Van Vleck, a similar formation just to the southeast that is almost attached to the outer rim. Due to its location, the crater appears foreshortened as seen from the Earth.

The crater has an oval-shaped outer rim that is longer along an east–west axis. There are some slumped shelves along the inner walls to the north and south. The interior floor is nearly featureless, with only a few tiny impacts. Neither the rim nor the interior are marked by impact craters of significance.

This crater was designated Gilbert N prior to being named by the IAU in 1976.
