= List of things named after Friedrich Bessel =

This is a (partial) list of things named for Friedrich Wilhelm Bessel, a 19th-century German scholar who worked in astronomy, geodesy and mathematical sciences:

== Astronomy, geodesy, astronomical bodies ==
- 1552 Bessel
- Bessel's star; see 61 Cygni
- Bessel (crater)
- Bessel ellipsoid
- Besselian elements
- Besselian epoch
- Bessel points
- Repsoid–Bessel pendulum

== Mathematics ==
- Bessel's correction
- Bessel's differential equation
- Bessel's inequality
- Bessel potential
- Bessel potential spaces
- Bessel process

=== Bessel and related functions ===
- Bessel beam
- Bessel filter
- Bessel function
  - Bessel–Maitland function
  - Incomplete Bessel functions
- Bessel polynomial
  - q-Bessel polynomials
- Bessel series, see Fourier–Bessel series
- Bessel window
- Bessel–Clifford function
- Fourier–Bessel series
