= Nikolay Yakovlevich Sonin =

Russian mathematician

Nikolay Sonin
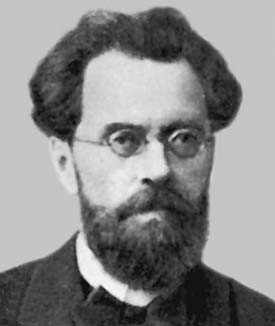
- Born: February 22, 1849; Tula, Russian Empire
- Died: February 27, 1915 (aged 66); St. Petersburg, Russian Empire
- Education: Lomonosov University
- Known for: Sonine formula, Sonin polynomial
- Scientific career
- Fields: Mathematics
- Doctoral advisor: Nikolai Bugaev

Nikolay Yakovlevich Sonin (Russian: Никола́й Я́ковлевич Со́нин, February 22, 1849 – February 27, 1915) was a Russian mathematician.

== Biography ==
He was born in Tula and attended Lomonosov University, studying mathematics and physics there from 1865 to 1869. His advisor was Nikolai Bugaev. He obtained a master's degree with a thesis submitted in 1871, then he taught at the University of Warsaw where he obtained a doctorate in 1874. He was appointed to a chair in the University of Warsaw in 1876. In 1894, Sonin moved to St. Petersburg, where he taught at the University for Women.

Sonin worked on special functions, in particular cylindrical functions. For instance, the Sonine formula is a formula given by Sonin for the integral of the product of three Bessel functions. He is furthermore credited with the introduction of the associated Laguerre polynomials. He also contributed to the Euler–Maclaurin summation formula.

Other topics Sonin studied include Bernoulli polynomials and approximate computation of definite integrals, continuing Chebyshev's work on numerical integration. Together with Andrey Markov, Sonin prepared a two volume edition of Chebyshev's works in French and Russian. He died in St. Petersburg.
