= Neumann polynomial =

In mathematics, the Neumann polynomials, introduced by Carl Neumann for the special case $\alpha=0$, are a sequence of polynomials in $1/t$ used to expand functions in term of Bessel functions.

The first few polynomials are

$$O_0^{(\alpha)}(t)=\frac 1 t,$$
$$O_1^{(\alpha)}(t)=2\frac {\alpha+1}{t^2},$$
$$O_2^{(\alpha)}(t)=\frac {2+\alpha}{t}+ 4\frac {(2+\alpha)(1+\alpha)}{t^3},$$
$$O_3^{(\alpha)}(t)=2\frac {(1+\alpha)(3+\alpha)}{t^2}+ 8\frac {(1+\alpha)(2+\alpha)(3+\alpha)}{t^4},$$
$$O_4^{(\alpha)}(t)=\frac {(1+\alpha)(4+\alpha)}{2t}+ 4\frac {(1+\alpha)(2+\alpha)(4+\alpha)}{t^3}+ 16\frac {(1+\alpha)(2+\alpha)(3+\alpha)(4+\alpha)}{t^5}.$$

A general form for the polynomial is

$$O_n^{(\alpha)}(t)= \frac{\alpha+n}{2\alpha} \sum_{k=0}^{\lfloor n/2\rfloor} (-1)^{n-k}\frac {(n-k)!} {k!} {-\alpha \choose n-k}\left(\frac 2 t \right)^{n+1-2k},$$

and they have the "generating function"

$$\frac{\left(\frac z 2 \right)^\alpha} {\Gamma(\alpha+1)} \frac 1 {t-z}= \sum_{n=0}O_n^{(\alpha)}(t) J_{\alpha+n}(z),$$

where J are Bessel functions.

To expand a function f in the form

$$f(z)=\left(\frac{2}{z}\right)^\alpha \sum_{n=0} a_n J_{\alpha+n}(z)\,$$

for $|t|<c$, compute

$$a_n=\frac {\Gamma(\alpha+1)} {2 \pi i} \oint_{|t|=c'}  f(t) O_n^{(\alpha)}(t)\,dt,$$

where $c'<c$ and c is the distance of the nearest singularity of f(z) from $z=0$.

== Examples ==
An example is the extension

$$\left(\tfrac{1}{2}z\right)^s= \Gamma(s)\cdot\sum_{k=0}(-1)^k J_{s+2k}(z)(s+2k){-s \choose k},$$

or the more general Sonine formula

$$e^{i \gamma z}= \Gamma(s)\cdot\sum_{k=0}i^k C_k^{(s)}(\gamma)(s+k)\frac{J_{s+k}(z)}{\left(\frac z 2\right)^s}.$$

where $C_k^{(s)}$ is Gegenbauer's polynomial. Then,

$$\frac{\left(\frac z 2\right)^{2k}}{(2k-1)!}J_s(z)= \sum_{i=k}(-1)^{i-k}{i+k-1\choose 2k-1}{i+k+s-1\choose 2k-1}(s+2i)J_{s+2i}(z),$$
$$\sum_{n=0} t^n J_{s+n}(z)= \frac{e^{\frac{t z}2}}{t^s} \sum_{j=0}\frac{\left(-\frac{z}{2t}\right)^j}{j!}\frac{\gamma \left(j+s,\frac{t z}{2}\right)}{\,\Gamma (j+s)}= \int_0^\infty e^{-\frac{z x^2}{2 t}}\frac {z x}{t} \frac{J_s(z\sqrt{1-x^2})}{\sqrt{1-x^2}^s}\,dx,$$

the confluent hypergeometric function

$$M(a,s,z)= \Gamma (s) \sum_{k=0}^\infty \left(-\frac{1}{t}\right)^k L_k^{(-a-k)}(t) \frac{J_{s+k-1}\left(2 \sqrt{t z}\right)}{(\sqrt{t z})^{s-k-1}},$$

and in particular

$$\frac{J_s(2 z)}{z^s}= \frac{4^s \Gamma\left(s+\frac12\right)}{\sqrt\pi}e^{2 i z}\sum_{k=0}L_k^{(-s-1/2-k)}\left(\frac{it}4\right)(4 i z)^k \frac{J_{2s+k}\left(2\sqrt{t z}\right)}{\sqrt{t z}^{2s+k}},$$

the index shift formula

$$\Gamma(\nu-\mu) J_\nu(z)= \Gamma(\mu+1) \sum_{n=0}\frac{\Gamma(\nu-\mu+n)}{n!\Gamma(\nu+n+1)} \left(\frac z 2\right)^{\nu-\mu+n}J_{\mu+n}(z),$$

the Taylor expansion (addition formula)

$$\frac{J_s\left(\sqrt{z^2-2uz}\right)}{\left(\sqrt{z^2-2uz}\right)^{\pm s}}= \sum_{k=0}\frac{(\pm u)^k}{k!}\frac{J_{s\pm k}(z)}{z^{\pm s}},$$

(cf.) and the expansion of the integral of the Bessel function,

$$\int J_s(z)dz= 2 \sum_{k=0} J_{s+2k+1}(z),$$

are of the same type.

== See also ==
- Bessel function
- Bessel polynomial
- Lommel polynomial
- Hankel transform
- Fourier–Bessel series
