= Bessel polynomials =

Mathematics concept

In mathematics, the Bessel polynomials are an orthogonal sequence of polynomials. There are a number of different but closely related definitions. The definition favored by mathematicians is given by the series

$$y_n(x)=\sum_{k=0}^n\frac{(n+k)!}{(n-k)!k!}\,\left(\frac{x}{2}\right)^k.$$

Another definition, favored by electrical engineers, is sometimes known as the reverse Bessel polynomials

$$\theta_n(x)=x^n\,y_n(1/x)=\sum_{k=0}^n\frac{(n+k)!}{(n-k)!k!}\,\frac{x^{n-k}}{2^{k}}.$$

The coefficients of the second definition are the same as the first but in reverse order. For example, the third-degree Bessel polynomial is

$$y_3(x)=1+6x+15x^2+15x^3$$

while the third-degree reverse Bessel polynomial is

$$\theta_3(x)=x^3+6x^2+15x+15.$$

The reverse Bessel polynomial is used in the design of Bessel electronic filters.

== Properties ==
=== Definition in terms of Bessel functions ===
The Bessel polynomial may also be defined using Bessel functions from which the polynomial draws its name.

$$y_n(x)=\,x^{n}\theta_n(1/x)\,$$
$$y_n(x)=\sqrt{\frac{2}{\pi x}}\,e^{1/x}K_{n+\frac 1 2}(1/x)$$
$$\theta_n(x)=\sqrt{\frac{2}{\pi}}\,x^{n+1/2}e^{x}K_{n+ \frac 1 2}(x)$$

where K_{n}(x) is a modified Bessel function of the second kind, y_{n}(x) is the ordinary polynomial, and θ_{n}(x) is the reverse polynomial. For example:

$$y_3(x)=15x^3+15x^2+6x+1 = \sqrt{\frac{2}{\pi x}}\,e^{1/x}K_{3+\frac 1 2}(1/x)$$

=== Definition as a hypergeometric function ===
The Bessel polynomial may also be defined as a confluent hypergeometric function

$$y_n(x)=\,_2F_0(-n,n+1;;-x/2)= \left(\frac 2 x\right)^{-n} U\left(-n,-2n,\frac 2 x\right)= \left(\frac 2 x\right)^{n+1} U\left(n+1,2n+2,\frac 2 x \right).$$

A similar expression holds true for the generalized Bessel polynomials (see below):

$$y_n(x;a,b)=\,_2F_0(-n,n+a-1;;-x/b)= \left(\frac b x\right)^{n+a-1} U\left(n+a-1,2n+a,\frac b x \right).$$

The reverse Bessel polynomial may be defined as a generalized Laguerre polynomial:

$$\theta_n(x)=\frac{n!}{(-2)^n}\,L_n^{-2n-1}(2x)$$

from which it follows that it may also be defined as a hypergeometric function:

$$\theta_n(x)=\frac{(-2n)_n}{(-2)^n}\,\,_1F_1(-n;-2n;2x)$$

where (−2n)_{n} is the Pochhammer symbol (rising factorial).

=== Generating function ===
The Bessel polynomials, with index shifted, have the generating function

$$\sum_{n=0}^\infty \sqrt{\frac 2 \pi} x^{n+\frac 1 2} e^x K_{n-\frac 1 2}(x) \frac {t^n}{n!}=1+x\sum_{n=1}^\infty \theta_{n-1}(x) \frac{t^n}{n!}= e^{x(1-\sqrt{1-2t})}.$$

Differentiating with respect to $t$, cancelling $x$, yields the generating function for the polynomials $\{\theta_n\}_{n\ge0}$

$$\sum_{n=0}^\infty \theta_{n}(x) \frac{t^n}{n!}=\frac{1}{\sqrt{1-2t}}e^{x(1-\sqrt{1-2t})}.$$

Similar generating function exists for the $y_n$ polynomials as well:

$$\sum_{n=0}^\infty y_{n-1}(x)\frac{t^n}{n!}=\exp\left(\frac{1-\sqrt{1-2xt}}{x}\right).$$

Upon setting $t=z-xz^2/2$, one has the following representation for the exponential function:

$$e^z=\sum_{n=0}^\infty y_{n-1}(x)\frac{(z-xz^2/2)^n}{n!}.$$

=== Recursion ===
The Bessel polynomial may also be defined by a recursion formula:

$$y_0(x)=1\,$$
$$y_1(x)=x+1\,$$
$$y_n(x)=(2n\!-\!1)x\,y_{n-1}(x)+y_{n-2}(x)\,$$

and

$$\theta_0(x)=1\,$$
$$\theta_1(x)=x+1\,$$
$$\theta_n(x)=(2n\!-\!1)\theta_{n-1}(x)+x^2\theta_{n-2}(x)\,$$

=== Differential equation ===
The Bessel polynomial obeys the following differential equation:

$$x^2\frac{d^2y_n(x)}{dx^2}+2(x\!+\!1)\frac{dy_n(x)}{dx}-n(n+1)y_n(x)=0$$

and

$$x\frac{d^2\theta_n(x)}{dx^2}-2(x\!+\!n)\frac{d\theta_n(x)}{dx}+2n\,\theta_n(x)=0$$

=== Orthogonality ===
The Bessel polynomials are orthogonal with respect to the weight $e^{-2/x}$ integrated over the unit circle of the complex plane. In other words, if $n \neq m$,

$\int_0^{2\pi} y_n\left(e^{i\theta}\right) y_m\left(e^{i\theta}\right) ie^{i\theta} \mathrm{d}\theta = 0$

They are also orthogonal with respect to a real weight, provided it is a hyperfunction.

== Generalization ==
=== Explicit form ===
A generalization of the Bessel polynomials have been suggested in literature, as following:

$$y_n(x;\alpha,\beta):= (-1)^n n! \left(\frac x \beta\right)^n L_n^{(1-2n-\alpha)}\left(\frac \beta x\right),$$

the corresponding reverse polynomials are

$$\theta_n(x;\alpha, \beta):= \frac{n!}{(-\beta)^n}L_n^{(1-2n-\alpha)}(\beta x)=x^n y_n\left(\frac 1 x;\alpha,\beta\right).$$

The explicit coefficients of the $y_n(x;\alpha, \beta)$ polynomials are:

$$y_n(x;\alpha, \beta)= \sum_{k=0}^n\binom{n}{k}(n+k+\alpha-2)^{\underline{k}}\left(\frac{x}{\beta}\right)^k.$$

Consequently, the $\theta_n(x;\alpha, \beta)$ polynomials can explicitly be written as follows:

$$\theta_n(x;\alpha, \beta)=\sum_{k=0}^n\binom{n}{k}(2n-k+\alpha-2)^{\underline{n-k}}\frac{x^k}{\beta^{n-k}}.$$

For the weighting function

$$\rho(x;\alpha,\beta) := {}_1F_1\left(1,\alpha-1,-\frac \beta x\right)$$

they are orthogonal, for the relation

$$0 = \oint_c\rho(x;\alpha,\beta)y_n(x;\alpha,\beta) y_m(x;\alpha,\beta)\,\mathrm d x$$

holds for m ≠ n and c a curve surrounding the 0 point.

They specialize to the Bessel polynomials for α = β = 2, in which situation ρ(x) = exp(−2/x).

=== Inverse Formulae ===
Powers of $x$ are expressed in terms of the generalized Bessel polynomials from the inverse connection formulae which have applications in change of basis to these polynomials.

$$x^n = \sum_{k=0}^n \alpha(n, k, \alpha, \beta)  \ y_{n-k}(x; \alpha, \beta)$$

where $\alpha(n, k, \alpha, \beta) = {n \choose k} \frac{(-1)^k \beta^n (2(n-k) + \alpha -1)}{(n-k+\alpha -1)_{n+1}}$ and $n \geq 0$.

Similarly, for the reverse generalized Bessel polynomials

$$x^n = \sum_{k=0}^n \alpha_1(n, k, \alpha, \beta)  \ \theta_{n-k}(x; \alpha, \beta)$$

where $\alpha_1(n, k, \alpha, \beta) = (-1)^k \frac{{n \choose k}}{\beta^k} (n + \alpha -1) (n +\alpha - 2k)_{k- 1}$ and $n \geq 0$.

=== Rodrigues formula for Bessel polynomials ===
The Rodrigues formula for the Bessel polynomials as particular solutions of the above differential equation is :

$$B_n^{(\alpha,\beta)}(x)=\frac{a_n^{(\alpha,\beta)}}{x^{\alpha} e^{-\frac{\beta}{x}}} \left(\frac{d}{dx}\right)^n (x^{\alpha+2n} e^{-\frac{\beta}{x}})$$

where a^{(α, β)}_{n} are normalization coefficients.

=== Associated Bessel polynomials ===
According to this generalization we have the following generalized differential equation for associated Bessel polynomials:

$$x^2\frac{d^2B_{n,m}^{(\alpha,\beta)}(x)}{dx^2} + [(\alpha+2)x+\beta]\frac{dB_{n,m}^{(\alpha,\beta)}(x)}{dx} - \left[ n(\alpha+n+1) + \frac{m \beta}{x} \right] B_{n,m}^{(\alpha,\beta)}(x)=0$$

where $0\leq m\leq n$. The solutions are,

$$B_{n,m}^{(\alpha,\beta)}(x)=\frac{a_{n,m}^{(\alpha,\beta)}}{x^{\alpha+m} e^{-\frac{\beta}{x}}} \left(\frac{d}{dx}\right)^{n-m} (x^{\alpha+2n} e^{-\frac{\beta}{x}})$$

== Zeros ==
If one denotes the zeros of $y_n(x;\alpha,\beta)$ as $\alpha_k^{(n)}(\alpha,\beta)$, and that of the $\theta_n(x;\alpha,\beta)$ by $\beta_k^{(n)}(\alpha,\beta)$, then the following estimates exist:

$$\frac{2}{n(n+\alpha-1)}\le\alpha_k^{(n)}(\alpha,2)\le\frac{2}{n+\alpha-1},$$

and

$$\frac{n+\alpha-1}{2}\le\beta_k^{(n)}(\alpha,2)\le\frac{n(n+\alpha-1)}{2},$$

for all $\alpha\ge2$. Moreover, all these zeros have negative real part.

Sharper results can be said if one resorts to more powerful theorems regarding the estimates of zeros of polynomials (more concretely, the Parabola Theorem of Saff and Varga, or differential equations techniques). One result is the following:

$$\frac{2}{2n+\alpha-\frac23}\le\alpha_k^{(n)}(\alpha,2)\le\frac{2}{n+\alpha-1}.$$

== Particular values ==
The Bessel polynomials $y_n(x)$ up to $n=5$ are

$$\begin{align}
y_0(x) & = 1 \\
y_1(x) & = x  +  1 \\
y_2(x) & = 3x^2+  3x  +  1 \\
y_3(x) & = 15x^3+ 15x^2+  6x  +  1 \\
y_4(x) & = 105x^4+105x^3+ 45x^2+ 10x  + 1 \\
y_5(x) & = 945x^5+945x^4+420x^3+105x^2+15x+1
\end{align}$$

No Bessel polynomial can be factored into lower degree polynomials with rational coefficients. The reverse Bessel polynomials are obtained by reversing the coefficients. Equivalently, $\theta_k(x) = x^k y_k(1/x)$. This results in the following:

$$\begin{align}
\theta_0(x) & = 1 \\
\theta_1(x) & = x + 1 \\
\theta_2(x) & = x^{2} + 3 x + 3 \\
\theta_3(x) & = x^{3} + 6 x^{2} + 15 x + 15 \\
\theta_4(x) & = x^{4} + 10 x^{3} + 45 x^{2} + 105 x + 105 \\
\theta_5(x) & = x^{5} + 15 x^{4} + 105 x^{3} + 420 x^{2} + 945 x + 945 \\
\end{align}$$

== See also ==
- Bessel function
- Neumann polynomial
- Lommel polynomial
- Hankel transform
- Fourier–Bessel series
