= Cylindrical harmonics =

Solutions to Laplace's equation

In mathematics, the cylindrical harmonics are a set of linearly independent functions that are solutions to Laplace's differential equation, $\nabla^2 V = 0$, expressed in cylindrical coordinates, ρ (radial coordinate), φ (polar angle), and z (height). Each function V_{n}(k) is the product of three terms, each depending on one coordinate alone. The ρ-dependent term is given by Bessel functions (which occasionally are also called cylindrical harmonics).

== Definition ==
Each function $V_n(k)$ of this basis consists of the product of three functions:
$$V_n(k;\rho,\varphi,z)=P_n(k,\rho)\Phi_n(\varphi)Z(k,z)\,$$
where $(\rho,\varphi,z)$ are the cylindrical coordinates, and n and k constants that differentiate the members of the set. As a result of the superposition principle applied to Laplace's equation, very general solutions to Laplace's equation can be obtained by linear combinations of these functions.

Since all surfaces with constant ρ, φ and z are conicoid, Laplace's equation is separable in cylindrical coordinates. Using the technique of the separation of variables, a separated solution to Laplace's equation can be expressed as:
$$V=P(\rho)\,\Phi(\varphi)\,Z(z)$$
and Laplace's equation, divided by V, is written:
$$\frac{\ddot{P}}{P}+\frac{1}{\rho}\,\frac{\dot{P}}{P}+\frac{1}{\rho^2}\,\frac{\ddot{\Phi}}{\Phi}+\frac{\ddot{Z}}{Z}=0$$

The Z part of the equation is a function of z alone, and must therefore be equal to a constant:
$$\frac{\ddot{Z}}{Z}=k^2$$
where k is, in general, a complex number. For a particular k, the Z(z) function has two linearly independent solutions. If k is real they are:
$$Z(k,z)=\cosh(kz)\,\,\,\,\,\,\mathrm{or}\,\,\,\,\,\,\sinh(kz)\,$$
or by their behavior at infinity:
$$Z(k,z)=e^{kz}\,\,\,\,\,\,\mathrm{or}\,\,\,\,\,\,e^{-kz}\,$$

If k is imaginary:
$$Z(k,z)=\cos(|k|z)\,\,\,\,\,\,\mathrm{or}\,\,\,\,\,\,\sin(|k|z)\,$$
or:
$$Z(k,z)=e^{i|k|z}\,\,\,\,\,\,\mathrm{or}\,\,\,\,\,\,e^{-i|k|z}\,$$

It can be seen that the Z(k,z) functions are the kernels of the Fourier transform or Laplace transform of the Z(z) function and so k may be a discrete variable for periodic boundary conditions, or it may be a continuous variable for non-periodic boundary conditions.

Substituting $k^2$ for $\ddot{Z}/Z$ , Laplace's equation may now be written:
$$\frac{\ddot{P}}{P}+\frac{1}{\rho}\,\frac{\dot{P}}{P}+\frac{1}{\rho^2}\frac{\ddot{\Phi}}{\Phi}+k^2=0$$

Multiplying by $\rho^2$, we may now separate the P and Φ functions and introduce another constant (n) to obtain:
$$\frac{\ddot{\Phi}}{\Phi} =-n^2$$
$$\rho^2\frac{\ddot{P}}{P}+\rho\frac{\dot{P}}{P}+k^2\rho^2=n^2$$

Since $\varphi$ is periodic, we may take n to be a non-negative integer and accordingly, the $\Phi(\varphi)$ the constants are subscripted. Real solutions for $\Phi(\varphi)$ are
$$\Phi_n=\cos(n\varphi)\,\,\,\,\,\,\mathrm{or}\,\,\,\,\,\,\sin(n\varphi)$$
or, equivalently:
$$\Phi_n=e^{in\varphi}\,\,\,\,\,\,\mathrm{or}\,\,\,\,\,\,e^{-in\varphi}$$

The differential equation for $\rho$ is a form of Bessel's equation.

If k is zero, but n is not, the solutions are:
$$P_n(0,\rho)=\rho^n\,\,\,\,\,\,\mathrm{or}\,\,\,\,\,\,\rho^{-n}\,$$

If both k and n are zero, the solutions are:
$$P_0(0,\rho)=\ln\rho\,\,\,\,\,\,\mathrm{or}\,\,\,\,\,\,1\,$$

If k is a real number we may write a real solution as:
$$P_n(k,\rho)=J_n(k\rho)\,\,\,\,\,\,\mathrm{or}\,\,\,\,\,\,Y_n(k\rho)\,$$
where $J_n(z)$ and $Y_n(z)$ are ordinary Bessel functions.

If k is an imaginary number, we may write a real solution as:
$$P_n(k,\rho)=I_n(|k|\rho)\,\,\,\,\,\,\mathrm{or}\,\,\,\,\,\,K_n(|k|\rho)\,$$
where $I_n(z)$ and $K_n(z)$ are modified Bessel functions.

The cylindrical harmonics for (k,n) are now the product of these solutions and the general solution to Laplace's equation is given by a linear combination of these solutions:
$$V(\rho,\varphi,z)=\sum_n \int d\left|k\right|\,\, A_n(k) P_n(k,\rho) \Phi_n(\varphi) Z(k,z)\,$$
where the $A_n(k)$ are constants with respect to the cylindrical coordinates and the limits of the summation and integration are determined by the boundary conditions of the problem. Note that the integral may be replaced by a sum for appropriate boundary conditions. The orthogonality of the $J_n(x)$ is often very useful when finding a solution to a particular problem. The $\Phi_n(\varphi)$ and $Z(k,z)$ functions are essentially Fourier or Laplace expansions, and form a set of orthogonal functions. When $P_n(k\rho)$ is simply $J_n(k\rho)$ , the orthogonality of $J_n$, along with the orthogonality relationships of $\Phi_n(\varphi)$ and $Z(k,z)$ allow the constants to be determined.

If $(x)_k$ is the sequence of the positive zeros of $J_n$ then:
$$\int_0^1 J_n(x_k\rho)J_n(x_k'\rho)\rho\,d\rho = \frac{1}{2}J_{n+1}(x_k)^2\delta_{kk'}$$

In solving problems, the space may be divided into any number of pieces, as long as the values of the potential and its derivative match across a boundary which contains no sources.

=== Example: Point source inside a conducting cylindrical tube ===
As an example, consider the problem of determining the potential of a unit source located at $(\rho_0,\varphi_0,z_0)$ inside a conducting cylindrical tube (e.g. an empty tin can) which is bounded above and below by the planes $z=-L$ and $z=L$ and on the sides by the cylinder $\rho=a$. (In MKS units, we will assume $q/4\pi\epsilon_0=1$). Since the potential is bounded by the planes on the z axis, the Z(k,z) function can be taken to be periodic. Since the potential must be zero at the origin, we take the $P_n(k\rho)$ function to be the ordinary Bessel function $J_n(k\rho)$, and it must be chosen so that one of its zeroes lands on the bounding cylinder. For the measurement point below the source point on the z axis, the potential will be:

$$V(\rho,\varphi,z)=\sum_{n=0}^\infty \sum_{r=0}^\infty\, A_{nr} J_n(k_{nr}\rho)\cos(n(\varphi-\varphi_0))\sinh(k_{nr}(L+z))\,\,\,\,\,z\le z_0$$
where $k_{nr}a$ is the r-th zero of $J_n(z)$ and, from the orthogonality relationships for each of the functions:
$$A_{nr}=\frac{4(2-\delta_{n0})}{a^2}\,\,\frac{\sinh k_{nr}(L-z_0)}{\sinh 2k_{nr}L}\,\,\frac{J_n(k_{nr}\rho_0)}{k_{nr}[J_{n+1}(k_{nr}a)]^2}\,$$

Above the source point:
$$V(\rho,\varphi,z)=\sum_{n=0}^\infty \sum_{r=0}^\infty\, A_{nr} J_n(k_{nr}\rho)\cos(n(\varphi-\varphi_0))\sinh(k_{nr}(L-z))\,\,\,\,\,z\ge z_0$$
$$A_{nr}=\frac{4(2-\delta_{n0})}{a^2}\,\,\frac{\sinh k_{nr}(L+z_0)}{\sinh 2k_{nr}L}\,\,\frac{J_n(k_{nr}\rho_0)}{k_{nr}[J_{n+1}(k_{nr}a)]^2}.\,$$

It is clear that when $\rho=a$ or $|z|=L$, the above function is zero. It can also be easily shown that the two functions match in value and in the value of their first derivatives at $z=z_0$.

==== Point source inside cylinder ====
Removing the plane ends (i.e. taking the limit as L approaches infinity) gives the field of the point source inside a conducting cylinder:
$$V(\rho,\varphi,z)=\sum_{n=0}^\infty \sum_{r=0}^\infty\, A_{nr} J_n(k_{nr}\rho)\cos(n(\varphi-\varphi_0))e^{-k_{nr}|z-z_0|}$$
$$A_{nr}=\frac{2(2-\delta_{n0})}{a^2}\,\,\frac{J_n(k_{nr}\rho_0)}{k_{nr}[J_{n+1}(k_{nr}a)]^2}.\,$$

==== Point source in open space ====
As the radius of the cylinder (a) approaches infinity, the sum over the zeroes of J_{n}(z) becomes an integral, and we have the field of a point source in infinite space:
$$V(\rho,\varphi,z)
=\frac{1}{R}
=\sum_{n=0}^\infty \int_0^\infty d\left|k\right|\, A_n(k) J_n(k\rho)\cos(n(\varphi-\varphi_0))e^{-k|z-z_0|}$$
$$A_n(k)=(2-\delta_{n0})J_n(k\rho_0)\,$$
and R is the distance from the point source to the measurement point:
$$R=\sqrt{(z-z_0)^2+\rho^2+\rho_0^2-2\rho\rho_0\cos(\varphi-\varphi_0)}.\,$$

==== Point source in open space at origin ====
Finally, when the point source is at the origin, $\rho_0=z_0=0$
$$V(\rho,\varphi,z)=\frac{1}{\sqrt{\rho^2+z^2}}=\int_0^\infty  J_0(k\rho)e^{-k|z|}\,dk.$$

== See also ==
- Spherical harmonics
