= Sonine formula =

Mathematical formula involving Bessel functions

In mathematics, Sonine's formula is any of several formulas involving Bessel functions found by Nikolay Yakovlevich Sonin.

One such formula is the following integral formula involving a product of three Bessel functions:

$$\int_0^\infty J_z(at) J_z(bt)J_z(ct) t^{1-z}\,dt = \frac{2^{z-1}\Delta(a,b,c)^{2z-1}}{\pi^{1/2}\Gamma(z+\tfrac 12)(abc)^z}$$

where Δ is the area of a triangle with given sides.
