= Fourier–Bessel series =

Infinite series of Bessel functions

In mathematics, Fourier–Bessel series is a particular kind of generalized Fourier series (an infinite series expansion on a finite interval) based on Bessel functions.

Fourier–Bessel series are used in the solution to partial differential equations, particularly in cylindrical coordinate systems.

== Definition ==
The Fourier–Bessel series of a function f(x) with a domain of [0, b] satisfying f(b) = 0

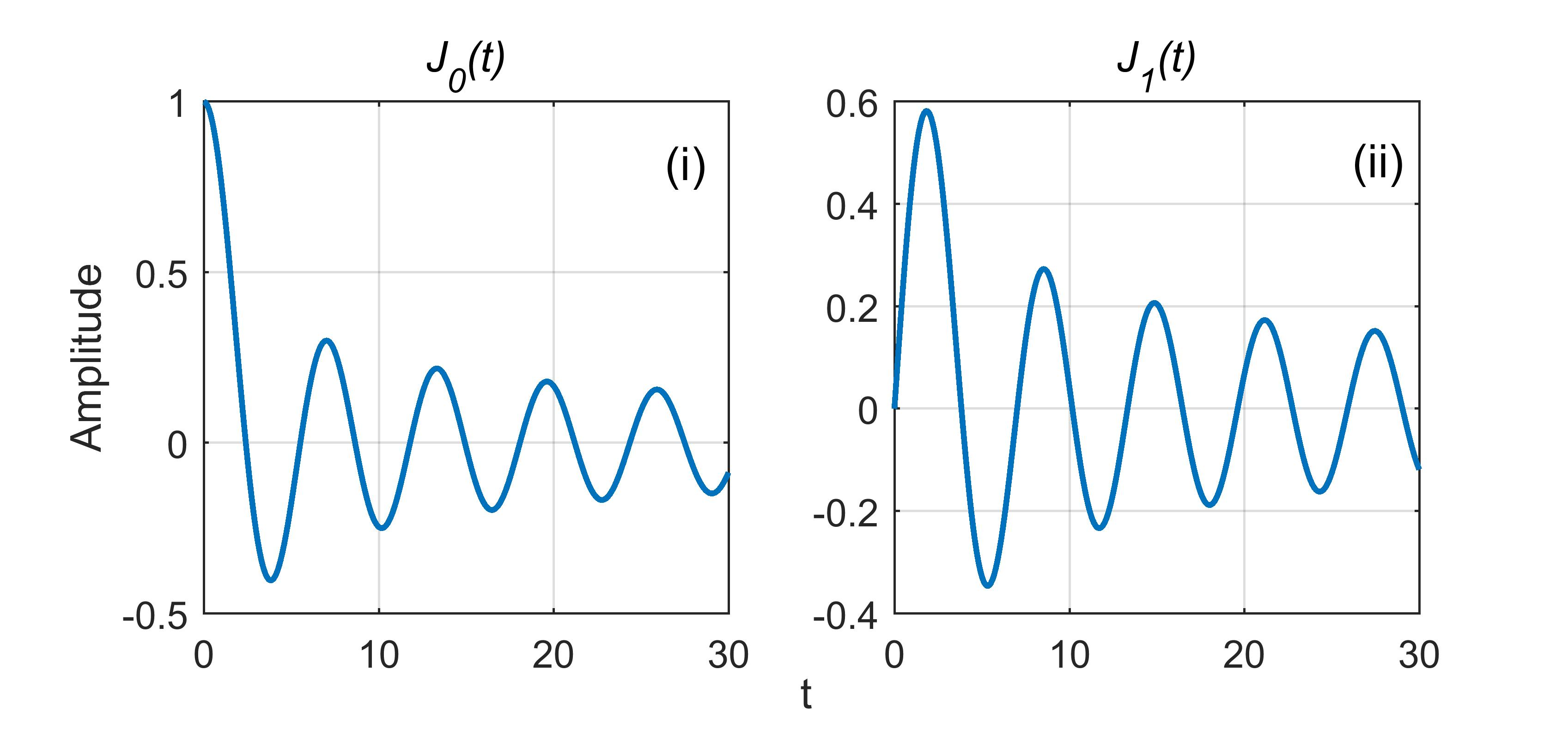
Bessel function for (i) $\alpha=0$ and (ii) $\alpha=1$.

$$f: [0,b] \to \R$$
is the representation of that function as a linear combination of many orthogonal versions of the same Bessel function of the first kind J_{α}, where the argument to each version n is differently scaled, according to
$$(J_\alpha )_n (x) := J_\alpha \left( \frac{u_{\alpha,n}}b x \right)$$
where u_{α,n} is a root, numbered n associated with the Bessel function J_{α} and c_{n} are the assigned coefficients:
$$f(x) \sim \sum_{n=1}^\infty c_n J_\alpha \left( \frac{u_{\alpha,n}}b x \right).$$

== Interpretation ==
The Fourier–Bessel series may be thought of as a Fourier expansion in the ρ coordinate of cylindrical coordinates. Just as the Fourier series is defined for a finite interval and has a counterpart, the continuous Fourier transform over an infinite interval, so the Fourier–Bessel series has a counterpart over an infinite interval, namely the Hankel transform.

== Calculating the coefficients ==
As said, differently scaled Bessel Functions are orthogonal with respect to the inner product

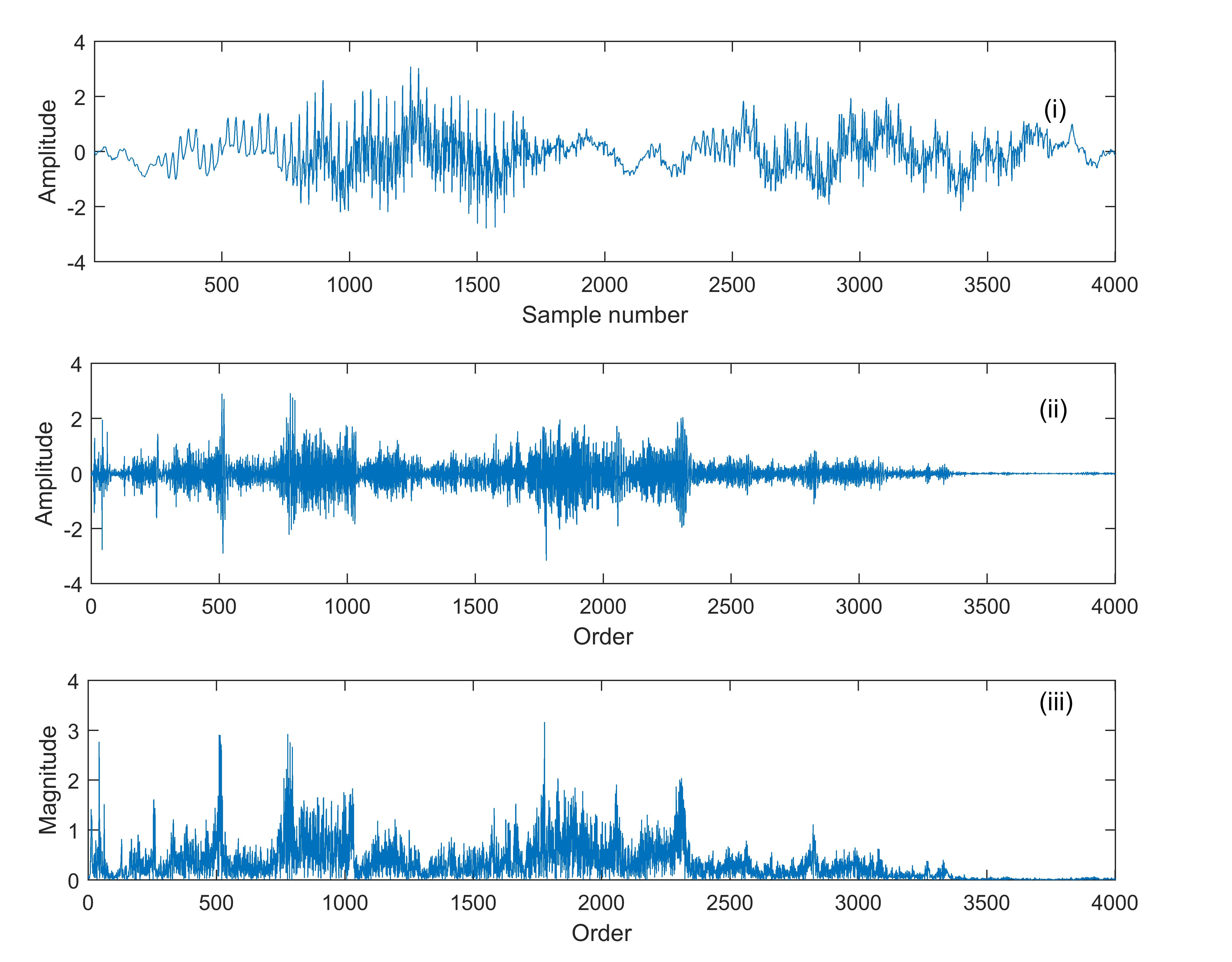
(i) Speech signal (mtlb.mat from Matlab toolbox), (ii) FBSE coefficients of speech signal, and (iii) magnitude of FBSE coefficients of speech signal.

$$\langle f,g \rangle = \int_0^b  x f(x) g(x) \, dx$$

according to

$$\int_0^b x J_\alpha\left(\frac{x u_{\alpha,n}}{b}\right)\,J_\alpha\left(\frac{x u_{\alpha,m}}{b}\right)\,dx
= \frac{b^2}{2} \delta_{mn}[J_{\alpha+1}(u_{\alpha,n})]^2,$$

(where: $\delta_{mn}$ is the Kronecker delta). The coefficients can be obtained from projecting the function f(x) onto the respective Bessel functions:

$$c_n = \frac{ \langle f,(J_\alpha)_n \rangle }{ \langle (J_\alpha)_n,(J_\alpha)_n \rangle } = \frac{ \int_0^b  x f(x) (J_\alpha)_n(x) \, dx }{ \frac12 (b J_{\alpha\pm1}(u_{\alpha,n}))^2}$$

where the plus or minus sign is equally valid.

For the inverse transform, one makes use of the following representation of the Dirac delta function

$$\frac{2 x^\alpha y^{1-\alpha}}{b^2} \sum_{k=1}^{\infty} \frac{J_\alpha\left(\frac{x u_{\alpha,k}}{b}\right)\,J_\alpha\left(\frac{y u_{\alpha,k}}{b}\right)}{J_{\alpha+1}^2(u_{\alpha,k})}
= \delta(x-y).$$

== Applications ==
The Fourier–Bessel series expansion employs aperiodic and decaying Bessel functions as the basis. The Fourier–Bessel series expansion has been successfully applied in diversified areas such as Gear fault diagnosis, discrimination of odorants in a turbulent ambient, postural stability analysis, detection of voice onset time, glottal closure instants (epoch) detection, separation of speech formants, speech enhancement, and speaker identification. The Fourier–Bessel series expansion has also been used to reduce cross terms in the Wigner–Ville distribution.

== Dini series ==
A second Fourier–Bessel series, also known as Dini series, is associated with the Robin boundary condition
$$b f'(b) + c f(b) = 0 ,$$
where $c$ is an arbitrary constant. The Dini series can be defined by
$$f(x) \sim \sum_{n=1}^\infty b_n J_\alpha(\gamma_n x/b),$$

where $\gamma_n$ is the n-th zero of $x J'_\alpha(x) + c J_\alpha(x)$.

The coefficients $b_n$ are given by
$$b_n = \frac{2 \gamma_n^2}{ b^2(c^2+\gamma_n^2-\alpha^2)J_\alpha^2(\gamma_n)}
\int_0^b J_\alpha(\gamma_n x/b)\,f(x) \,x \,dx.$$

== See also ==
- Orthogonality
- Generalized Fourier series
- Hankel transform
- Kapteyn series
- Neumann polynomial
- Schlömilch's series
