= Lerche–Newberger sum rule =

Finds the sum of certain infinite series involving Bessel functions of the first kind

In mathematics, the Lerche–Newberger sum rule, or Newberger sum rule, discovered by B. S. Newberger in 1982, finds the sum of certain infinite series involving Bessel functions $J_\alpha$ of the first kind. It states that if $\mu$ is any non-integer complex number, $\gamma \in (0,1]$, and $\Re(\alpha+\beta)>-1$, then

$$\sum_{n=-\infty}^\infty\frac{(-1)^n J_{\alpha - \gamma n}(z)J_{\beta + \gamma n}(z)}{n+\mu}=\frac{\pi}{\sin \mu \pi}J_{\alpha + \gamma \mu}(z)J_{\beta - \gamma \mu}(z).$$

Newberger's formula generalizes a formula of this type proven by Lerche in 1966. Lerche's formula has $\gamma=1$; both extend a standard rule for the summation of Bessel functions, and are useful in plasma physics.
