= Kontorovich–Lebedev transform =

Mathematical integral transform

In mathematics, the Kontorovich–Lebedev transform is an integral transform which uses a Macdonald function (modified Bessel function of the second kind) with imaginary index as its kernel. Unlike other Bessel function transforms, such as the Hankel transform, this transform involves integrating over the index of the function rather than its argument.

The transform of a function $f(x)$ and its inverse (provided they exist) are given below:

$$g(y) = \int_0^\infty f(x) K_{iy}(x) \, dx$$

$$f(x) = \frac{2}{\pi^2 x} \int_0^\infty g(y) K_{iy}(x) \sinh (\pi y) y \, dy .$$

Laguerre previously studied a similar transform regarding Laguerre function as:

$$g(y) = \int_0^\infty f(x)e^{-x} L_{y}(x) \, dx$$

$$f(x) = \int_0^\infty \frac{g(y)}{\Gamma (y)} L_y(x) \, dy.$$

Erdélyi et al., for instance, contains a short list of Kontorovich–Lebedev transforms as well references to the original work of Kontorovich and Lebedev in the late 1930s. This transform is mostly used in solving the Laplace equation in cylindrical coordinates for wedge shaped domains by the method of separation of variables.
