= Bessel–Clifford function =

the Bessel-Clifford function evaluated at n=3 divided by 22 as C(3 divided 22,z) from -2-2i to 2+2i

In mathematical analysis, the Bessel–Clifford function, named after Friedrich Bessel and William Kingdon Clifford, is an entire function of two complex variables that can be used to provide an alternative development of the theory of Bessel functions. If

$$\pi(x) = \frac{1}{\Pi(x)} = \frac{1}{\Gamma(x+1)}$$

is the entire function defined by means of the reciprocal gamma function, then the Bessel–Clifford function is defined by the series

$${\mathcal C}_n(z) = \sum_{k=0}^\infty \pi(k+n) \frac{z^k}{k!}$$

The ratio of successive terms is z/k(n + k), which for all values of z and n tends to zero with increasing k. By the ratio test, this series converges absolutely for all z and n, and uniformly for all regions with bounded |z|, and hence the Bessel–Clifford function is an entire function of the two complex variables n and z.

== Differential equation of the Bessel–Clifford function ==
It follows from the above series on differentiating with respect to x that ${\mathcal C}_n(x)$ satisfies the linear second-order homogeneous differential equation

$$xy'' + (n+1)y' = y. \qquad$$

This equation is of generalized hypergeometric type, and in fact the Bessel–Clifford function is up to a scaling factor a Pochhammer–Barnes hypergeometric function; we have

$${\mathcal C}_n(z) = \pi(n)\ _0F_1(;n+1; z).$$

Unless n is a negative integer, in which case the right-hand side is undefined, the two definitions are essentially equivalent; the hypergeometric function being normalized so that its value at z = 0 is one.

== Relation to Bessel functions ==
The Bessel function of the first kind can be defined in terms of the Bessel–Clifford function as

$$J_n(z) = \left(\frac{z}{2}\right)^n {\mathcal C}_n\left(-\frac{z^2}{4}\right);$$

when n is not an integer. We can see from this that the Bessel function is not entire. Similarly, the modified Bessel function of the first kind can be defined as

$$I_n(z) = \left(\frac{z}{2}\right)^n {\mathcal C}_n\left(\frac{z^2}{4}\right).$$

The procedure can of course be reversed, so that we may define the Bessel–Clifford function as

$${\mathcal C}_n(z) = z^{-n/2} I_n(2 \sqrt{z});$$

but from this starting point we would then need to show ${\mathcal C}$ was entire.

== Recurrence relation ==
From the defining series, it follows immediately that $\frac{d}{dx}{\mathcal C}_n(x) = {\mathcal C}_{n+1}(x).$

Using this, we may rewrite the differential equation for ${\mathcal C}$ as

$$x {\mathcal C}_{n+2}(x) + (n+1){\mathcal C}_{n+1}(x) = {\mathcal C}_n(x),$$

which defines the recurrence relationship for the Bessel–Clifford function. This is equivalent to a similar relation for _{0}F_{1}. We have, as a special case of Gauss's continued fraction

$$\frac{{\mathcal C}_{n+1}(x)}{{\mathcal C}_n(x)} = \cfrac{1}{n+1 + \cfrac{x}{n+2+\cfrac{x}{n+3+ \cfrac{x}{\ddots}}}}.$$

It can be shown that this continued fraction converges in all cases.

== The Bessel–Clifford function of the second kind ==
The Bessel–Clifford differential equation

$$xy'' + (n+1)y' = y \qquad$$

has two linearly independent solutions. Since the origin is a regular singular point of the differential equation, and since ${\mathcal C}$ is entire, the second solution must be singular at the origin.

If we set

$${\mathcal K}_n(x) = \frac{1}{2} \int_0^\infty \exp\left(-t-\frac{x}{t}\right) \frac{dt}{t^{n+1}}$$

which converges for $\Re(x) > 0$, and analytically continue it, we obtain a second linearly independent solution to the differential equation.

The factor of 1/2 is inserted in order to make ${\mathcal K}$ correspond to the Bessel functions of the second kind. We have

$$K_n(x) = \left(\frac{x}{2}\right)^n {\mathcal K}_n\left(\frac{x^2}{4}\right).$$

and

$$Y_n(x) = \left(\frac{x}{2}\right)^n {\mathcal K}_n\left(-\frac{x^2}{4}\right).$$

In terms of K, we have

$${\mathcal K}_n(x) = x^{-n/2} K_n(2 \sqrt{x}).$$

Hence, just as the Bessel function and modified Bessel function of the first kind can both be expressed in terms of ${\mathcal C}$, those of the second kind can both be expressed in terms of ${\mathcal K}$.

== Generating function ==
If we multiply the absolutely convergent series for exp(t) and exp(z/t) together, we get (when t is not zero) an absolutely convergent series for exp(t + z/t). Collecting terms in t, we find on comparison with the power series definition for ${\mathcal C}_n$ that we have

$$\exp\left(t + \frac{z}{t}\right) = \sum_{n=-\infty}^\infty t^n {\mathcal C}_n(z).$$

This generating function can then be used to obtain further formulas, in particular we may use Cauchy's integral formula and obtain ${\mathcal C}_n$ for integer n as

$${\mathcal C}_n(z) = \frac{1}{2 \pi i} \oint_C \frac{\exp(t+z/t)}{t^{n+1}}\, dt = \frac{1}{2 \pi}\int_0^{2 \pi} \exp(z\exp(-i\theta)+\exp(i\theta)-ni\theta)\,d\theta.$$
