= Kapteyn series =

Mathematical concept

Kapteyn series is a series expansion of analytic functions on a domain in terms of the Bessel function of the first kind. Kapteyn series are named after Willem Kapteyn, who first studied such series in 1893. Let $f$ be a function analytic on the domain

$$D_a = \left\{z\in\mathbb{C}:\Omega(z)=\left|\frac{z\exp\sqrt{1-z^2}}{1+\sqrt{1-z^2}}\right|\le a\right\}$$

with $a<1$. Then $f$ can be expanded in the form

$$f(z) = \alpha_0 + 2\sum_{n=1}^\infty \alpha_n J_n(nz)\quad(z\in D_a),$$

where

$$\alpha_n = \frac{1}{2\pi i}\oint\Theta_n(z)f(z)dz.$$

The path of the integration is the boundary of $D_a$. Here $\Theta_0(z)=1/z$, and for $n>0$, $\Theta_n(z)$ is defined by

$$\Theta_n(z) = \frac14\sum_{k=0}^{\left[\frac{n}2\right]}\frac{(n-2k)^2(n-k-1)!}{k!}\left(\frac{nz}{2}\right)^{2k-n}$$

Kapteyn's series are important in physical problems. Among other applications, the solution $E$ of Kepler's equation $M=E-e\sin E$ can be expressed via a Kapteyn series:

$$E=M+2\sum_{n=1}^\infty\frac{\sin(nM)}{n}J_n(ne).$$

== Relation between the Taylor coefficients and the α_{n} coefficients of a function ==
Let us suppose that the Taylor series of $f$ reads as

$$f(z)=\sum_{n=0}^\infty a_nz^n.$$

Then the $\alpha_n$ coefficients in the Kapteyn expansion of $f$ can be determined as follows.

$$\begin{align}
\alpha_0 &= a_0,\\
\alpha_n &= \frac14\sum_{k=0}^{\left\lfloor\frac{n}2 \right\rfloor}\frac{(n-2k)^2(n-k-1)!}{k!(n/2)^{(n-2k+1)}}a_{n-2k}\quad(n\ge1).
\end{align}$$

== Examples ==
The Kapteyn series of the powers of $z$ are found by Kapteyn himself:

$$\left(\frac{z}{2}\right)^{n}=n^{2} \sum_{m=0}^\infty \frac{(n+m-1)!}{(n+2 m)^{n+1}\, m!} J_{n+2 m}\{(n+2 m) z\}\quad(z\in D_1).$$

For $n = 1$ it follows (see also)

$$z = 2 \sum_{k=0}^\infty \frac{J_{2k+1}((2k+1)z)}{(2k+1)^2},$$

and for $n = 2$

$$z^2 = 2 \sum_{k=1}^\infty \frac{J_{2k}(2kz)}{k^2}.$$

Furthermore, inside the region $D_1$,

$$\frac{1}{1-z} = 1 + 2 \sum_{k=1}^\infty J_k(kz).$$

== See also ==
- Schlömilch's series
