= Schlömilch's series =

Fourier series type expansion

Schlömilch's series is a Fourier series type expansion of twice continuously differentiable function in the interval $(0,\pi)$ in terms of the Bessel function of the first kind, named after the German mathematician Oskar Schlömilch, who derived the series in 1857. The real-valued function $f(x)$ has the following expansion:

$$f(x) = a_0 + \sum_{n=1}^\infty a_n J_0(nx),$$

where

$$\begin{align}
a_0 &= f(0) + \frac{1}{\pi} \int_0^\pi \int_0^{\pi/2} u f'(u\sin\theta)\ d\theta\ du, \\
a_n &= \frac{2}{\pi} \int_0^\pi \int_0^{\pi/2} u\cos nu \ f'(u\sin\theta)\ d\theta\ du.
\end{align}$$

== Examples ==
Some examples of Schlömilch's series are the following:

- Null functions in the interval $(0,\pi)$ can be expressed by Schlömilch's Series, $0 = \frac{1}{2}+\sum_{n=1}^\infty (-1)^n J_0(nx)$, which cannot be obtained by Fourier series. This is particularly interesting because the null function is represented by a series expansion in which not all the coefficients are zero. The series converges only when $0<x<\pi$; the series oscillates at $x=0$ and diverges at $x=\pi$. This theorem is generalized so that $0 = \frac{1}{2\Gamma(\nu+1)}+\sum_{n=1}^\infty (-1)^n J_0(nx)/(nx/2)^\nu$ when $-1/2<\nu\leq 1/2$ and $0<x<\pi$ and also when $\nu> 1/2$ and $0<x\leq \pi$. These properties were identified by Niels Nielsen.
- $x = \frac{\pi^2}{4}-2\sum_{n=1,3,...}^\infty \frac{J_0(nx)}{n^2}, \quad 0<x<\pi.$
- $x^2 = \frac{2\pi^2}{3} + 8 \sum_{n=1}^\infty \frac{(-1)^n}{n^2}J_0(nx), \quad -\pi<x<\pi.$
- $\frac{1}{x} + \sum_{m=1}^k\frac{2}{\sqrt{x^2-4m^2\pi^2}} = \frac{1}{2} + \sum_{n=1}^\infty J_0(nx), \quad 2k\pi<x<2(k+1)\pi.$
- If $(r,z)$ are the cylindrical polar coordinates, then the series $1+\sum_{n=1}^\infty e^{-nz}J_0(nr)$ is a solution of Laplace equation for $z>0$.

== See also ==
- Kapteyn series
