= Bessel–Maitland function =

Generalization of Bessel function

In mathematics, the Bessel–Maitland function, or Wright generalized Bessel function, is a generalization of the Bessel function, introduced by Edward Maitland Wright (1934). It allows to model more complex phenomena by providing solutions to a broader class of fractional-order differential equations than possible with standard Bessel functions.

== Etymology ==
The name "Bessel–Maitland function" contains a historical misnomer—"Maitland" appears in the function's name due to a confusion between Edward Maitland Wright's middle name and surname. While Wright is correctly recognized as the mathematician who generalized Johann Friedrich Bessel's original work, this nomenclature error has persisted in the mathematical literature.

== Definition ==
The function is given by

$$J^{\mu,\nu}(z) = \sum_{k\ge 0} \frac{(-z)^k}{\Gamma(k\mu+\nu+1)k!}.$$
