= Incomplete Bessel functions =

In mathematics, the incomplete Bessel functions are types of special functions which act as a type of extension from the complete-type of Bessel functions.

== Definition ==
The incomplete Bessel functions are defined as the same delay differential equations of the complete-type Bessel functions:

$$J_{v-1}(z,w)-J_{v+1}(z,w)=2\dfrac{\partial}{\partial z}J_v(z,w)$$
$$Y_{v-1}(z,w)-Y_{v+1}(z,w)=2\dfrac{\partial}{\partial z}Y_v(z,w)$$
$$I_{v-1}(z,w)+I_{v+1}(z,w)=2\dfrac{\partial}{\partial z}I_v(z,w)$$
$$K_{v-1}(z,w)+K_{v+1}(z,w)=-2\dfrac{\partial}{\partial z}K_v(z,w)$$
$$H_{v-1}^{(1)}(z,w)-H_{v+1}^{(1)}(z,w)=2\dfrac{\partial}{\partial z}H_v^{(1)}(z,w)$$
$$H_{v-1}^{(2)}(z,w)-H_{v+1}^{(2)}(z,w)=2\dfrac{\partial}{\partial z}H_v^{(2)}(z,w)$$

And the following suitable extension forms of delay differential equations from that of the complete-type Bessel functions:

$$J_{v-1}(z,w)+J_{v+1}(z,w)=\dfrac{2v}{z}J_v(z,w)-\dfrac{2\tanh vw}{z}\dfrac{\partial}{\partial w}J_v(z,w)$$
$$Y_{v-1}(z,w)+Y_{v+1}(z,w)=\dfrac{2v}{z}Y_v(z,w)-\dfrac{2\tanh vw}{z}\dfrac{\partial}{\partial w}Y_v(z,w)$$
$$I_{v-1}(z,w)-I_{v+1}(z,w)=\dfrac{2v}{z}I_v(z,w)-\dfrac{2\tanh vw}{z}\dfrac{\partial}{\partial w}I_v(z,w)$$
$$K_{v-1}(z,w)-K_{v+1}(z,w)=-\dfrac{2v}{z}K_v(z,w)+\dfrac{2\tanh vw}{z}\dfrac{\partial}{\partial w}K_v(z,w)$$
$$H_{v-1}^{(1)}(z,w)+H_{v+1}^{(1)}(z,w)=\dfrac{2v}{z}H_v^{(1)}(z,w)-\dfrac{2\tanh vw}{z}\dfrac{\partial}{\partial w}H_v^{(1)}(z,w)$$
$$H_{v-1}^{(2)}(z,w)+H_{v+1}^{(2)}(z,w)=\dfrac{2v}{z}H_v^{(2)}(z,w)-\dfrac{2\tanh vw}{z}\dfrac{\partial}{\partial w}H_v^{(2)}(z,w)$$

Where the new parameter $w$ defines the integral bound of the upper-incomplete form and lower-incomplete form of the modified Bessel function of the second kind:

$$K_v(z,w)=\int_w^\infty e^{-z\cosh t}\cosh vt~dt$$
$$J_v(z,w)=\int_0^we^{-z\cosh t}\cosh vt~dt$$

== Properties ==
$$J_v(z,w)=J_v(z)+\dfrac{e^\frac{v\pi i}{2}J(iz,v,w)-e^{-\frac{v\pi i}{2}}J(-iz,v,w)}{i\pi}$$
$$Y_v(z,w)=Y_v(z)+\dfrac{e^\frac{v\pi i}{2}J(iz,v,w)+e^{-\frac{v\pi i}{2}}J(-iz,v,w)}{\pi}$$
$I_{-v}(z,w)=I_v(z,w)$ for integer $v$
$$I_{-v}(z,w)-I_v(z,w)=I_{-v}(z)-I_v(z)-\dfrac{2\sin v\pi}{\pi}J(z,v,w)$$
$$I_v(z,w)=I_v(z)+\dfrac{J(-z,v,w)-e^{-v\pi i}J(z,v,w)}{i\pi}$$
$$I_v(z,w)=e^{-\frac{v\pi i}{2}}J_v(iz,w)$$
$$K_{-v}(z,w)=K_v(z,w)$$
$K_v(z,w)=\dfrac{\pi}{2}\dfrac{I_{-v}(z,w)-I_v(z,w)}{\sin v\pi}$ for non-integer $v$
$$H_v^{(1)}(z,w)=J_v(z,w)+iY_v(z,w)$$
$$H_v^{(2)}(z,w)=J_v(z,w)-iY_v(z,w)$$
$$H_{-v}^{(1)}(z,w)=e^{v\pi i}H_v^{(1)}(z,w)$$
$$H_{-v}^{(2)}(z,w)=e^{-v\pi i}H_v^{(2)}(z,w)$$
$H_v^{(1)}(z,w)=\dfrac{J_{-v}(z,w)-e^{-v\pi i}J_v(z,w)}{i\sin v\pi}=\dfrac{Y_{-v}(z,w)-e^{-v\pi i}Y_v(z,w)}{\sin v\pi}$ for non-integer $v$
$H_v^{(2)}(z,w)=\dfrac{e^{v\pi i}J_v(z,w)-J_{-v}(z,w)}{i\sin v\pi}=\dfrac{Y_{-v}(z,w)-e^{v\pi i}Y_v(z,w)}{\sin v\pi}$ for non-integer $v$

== Differential equations ==
$K_v(z,w)$ satisfies the inhomogeneous Bessel's differential equation

$$z^2\dfrac{d^2y}{dz^2}+z\dfrac{dy}{dz}-(x^2+v^2)y=(v\sinh vw+z\cosh vw\sinh w)e^{-z\cosh w}$$

Both $J_v(z,w)$ , $Y_v(z,w)$ , $H_v^{(1)}(z,w)$ and $H_v^{(2)}(z,w)$ satisfy the partial differential equation

$$z^2\dfrac{\partial^2y}{\partial z^2}+z\dfrac{\partial y}{\partial z}+(z^2-v^2)y-\dfrac{\partial^2y}{\partial w^2}+2v\tanh vw\dfrac{\partial y}{\partial w}=0$$

Both $I_v(z,w)$ and $K_v(z,w)$ satisfy the partial differential equation

$$z^2\dfrac{\partial^2y}{\partial z^2}+z\dfrac{\partial y}{\partial z}-(z^2+v^2)y-\dfrac{\partial^2y}{\partial w^2}+2v\tanh vw\dfrac{\partial y}{\partial w}=0$$

== Integral representations ==
Base on the preliminary definitions above, one would derive directly the following integral forms of $J_v(z,w)$ , $Y_v(z,w)$:

$$\begin{align}
J_v(z,w)&=J_v(z)+\dfrac{1}{\pi i}\left(\int_0^we^{\frac{v\pi i}{2}-iz\cosh t}\cosh vt~dt-\int_0^we^{iz\cosh t-\frac{v\pi i}{2}}\cosh vt~dt\right)
\\&=J_v(z)+\dfrac{1}{\pi i}\left(\int_0^w\cos\left(z\cosh t-\dfrac{v\pi}{2}\right)\cosh vt~dt-i\int_0^w\sin\left(z\cosh t-\dfrac{v\pi}{2}\right)\cosh vt~dt\right.\\
&\quad\quad\quad\quad\quad\quad\left.-\int_0^w\cos\left(z\cosh t-\dfrac{v\pi}{2}\right)\cosh vt~dt-i\int_0^w\sin\left(z\cosh t-\dfrac{v\pi}{2}\right)\cosh vt~dt\right)
\\&=J_v(z)+\dfrac{1}{\pi i}\left(-2i\int_0^w\sin\left(z\cosh t-\dfrac{v\pi}{2}\right)\cosh vt~dt\right)
\\&=J_v(z)-\dfrac{2}{\pi}\int_0^w\sin\left(z\cosh t-\dfrac{v\pi}{2}\right)\cosh vt~dt\end{align}$$
$$\begin{align}
Y_v(z,w)&=Y_v(z)+\dfrac{1}{\pi}\left(\int_0^we^{\frac{v\pi i}{2}-iz\cosh t}\cosh vt~dt+\int_0^we^{iz\cosh t-\frac{v\pi i}{2}}\cosh vt~dt\right)
\\&=Y_v(z)+\dfrac{1}{\pi}\left(\int_0^w\cos\left(z\cosh t-\dfrac{v\pi}{2}\right)\cosh vt~dt-i\int_0^w\sin\left(z\cosh t-\dfrac{v\pi}{2}\right)\cosh vt~dt\right.\\
&\quad\quad\quad\quad\quad\quad\left.+\int_0^w\cos\left(z\cosh t-\dfrac{v\pi}{2}\right)\cosh vt~dt+i\int_0^w\sin\left(z\cosh t-\dfrac{v\pi}{2}\right)\cosh vt~dt\right)
\\&=Y_v(z)+\dfrac{2}{\pi}\int_0^w\cos\left(z\cosh t-\dfrac{v\pi}{2}\right)\cosh vt~dt\end{align}$$

With the Mehler–Sonine integral expressions of $J_v(z)=\dfrac{2}{\pi}\int_0^\infty\sin\left(z\cosh t-\dfrac{v\pi}{2}\right)\cosh vt~dt$ and $Y_v(z)=-\dfrac{2}{\pi}\int_0^\infty\cos\left(z\cosh t-\dfrac{v\pi}{2}\right)\cosh vt~dt$ mentioned in Digital Library of Mathematical Functions,

we can further simplify to $J_v(z,w)=\dfrac{2}{\pi}\int_w^\infty\sin\left(z\cosh t-\dfrac{v\pi}{2}\right)\cosh vt~dt$ and $Y_v(z,w)=-\dfrac{2}{\pi}\int_w^\infty\cos\left(z\cosh t-\dfrac{v\pi}{2}\right)\cosh vt~dt$ , but the issue is not quite good since the convergence range will reduce greatly to $|v|<1$.
