= Bessel function =

Family of solutions to related differential equations

Bessel functions describe the radial part of vibrations of a circular membrane.

Bessel functions are a class of special functions that commonly appear in problems involving wave motion, heat conduction, and other physical phenomena with circular or cylindrical symmetry. They are named after the German astronomer and mathematician Friedrich Bessel, who studied them systematically in 1824.

Bessel functions are solutions to a particular type of ordinary differential equation:
$$x^2 \frac{d^2 y}{dx^2} + x \frac{dy}{dx} + \left(x^2 - \alpha^2 \right)y = 0,$$
where $\alpha$ is a number that determines the shape of the solution. This number is called the order of the Bessel function and can be any complex number. Although the same equation arises for both $\alpha$ and $-\alpha$, mathematicians define separate Bessel functions for each to ensure the functions behave smoothly as the order changes.

The most important cases are when $\alpha$ is an integer or a half-integer. When $\alpha$ is an integer, the resulting Bessel functions are often called cylinder functions or cylindrical harmonics because they naturally arise when solving problems (like Laplace's equation) in cylindrical coordinates. When $\alpha$ is a half-integer, the solutions are called spherical Bessel functions and are used in spherical systems, such as in solving the Helmholtz equation in spherical coordinates.

== Applications ==
Bessel's equation arises when finding separable solutions to Laplace's equation and the Helmholtz equation in cylindrical or spherical coordinates. Bessel functions are therefore especially important for many problems of wave propagation and static potentials. In solving problems in cylindrical coordinate systems, one obtains Bessel functions of integer order ($\alpha=n$); in spherical problems, one obtains half-integer orders ($\alpha=n+1/2$). For example:

- Electromagnetic waves in a cylindrical waveguide
- Pressure amplitudes of inviscid rotational flows
- Heat conduction in a cylindrical object
- Modes of vibration of a thin circular or annular acoustic membrane (such as a drumhead or other membranophone) or thicker plates such as sheet metal (see Kirchhoff–Love plate theory, Mindlin–Reissner plate theory)
- Diffusion problems on a lattice
- Solutions to the Schrödinger equation in spherical and cylindrical coordinates for a free particle
- Position space representation of the Feynman propagator in quantum field theory
- Solving for patterns of acoustical radiation
- Frequency-dependent friction in circular pipelines
- Dynamics of floating bodies
- Angular resolution
- X-ray crystallography of helical structures, including DNA and the alpha helix of proteins
- Probability density function of product of two normally distributed random variables
- Analyzing of the surface waves generated by microtremors, in geophysics and seismology.

Bessel functions also appear in other fields, such as signal processing (e.g., see FM audio synthesis, Kaiser window, or Bessel filter). They also appear in pure mathematics as part of the Fourier expansion of Maass forms.

== Definitions ==
Because this is a linear differential equation, solutions can be scaled to any amplitude. The amplitudes chosen for the functions originate from the early work in which the functions appeared as solutions to definite integrals rather than solutions to differential equations. Because the differential equation is second-order, there must be two linearly independent solutions: one of the first kind and one of the second kind. Depending upon the circumstances, however, various formulations of these solutions are convenient. Different variations are summarized in the table below and described in the following sections. The subscript n is typically used in place of $\alpha$ when $\alpha$ is known to be an integer.

Type	First kind	Second kind
Bessel functions	J_{α}	Y_{α}
Modified Bessel functions	I_{α}	K_{α}
Hankel functions	H^{(1)}_{α} = J_{α} + iY_{α}	H^{(2)}_{α} = J_{α} − iY_{α}
Spherical Bessel functions	j_{n}	y_{n}
Modified spherical Bessel functions	i_{n}	k_{n}
Spherical Hankel functions	h^{(1)}_{n} = j_{n} + iy_{n}	h^{(2)}_{n} = j_{n} − iy_{n}

Bessel functions of the second kind and the spherical Bessel functions of the second kind are sometimes denoted by N_{n} and n_{n}, respectively, rather than Y_{n} and y_{n}.

=== Bessel functions of the first kind: J_{α} ===
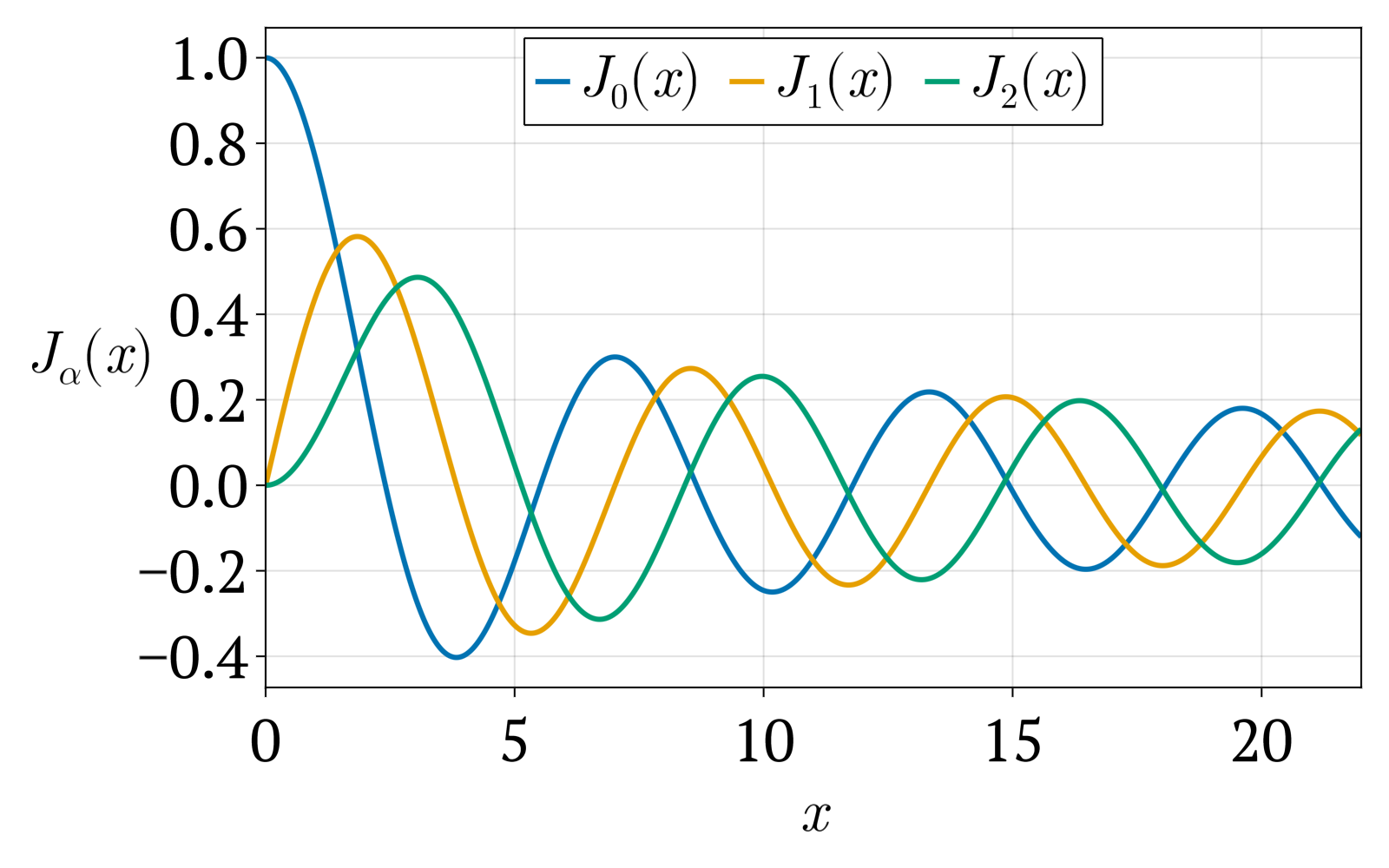
Plot of Bessel function of the first kind, $J_\alpha(x)$, for integer orders $\alpha=0,1,2$.

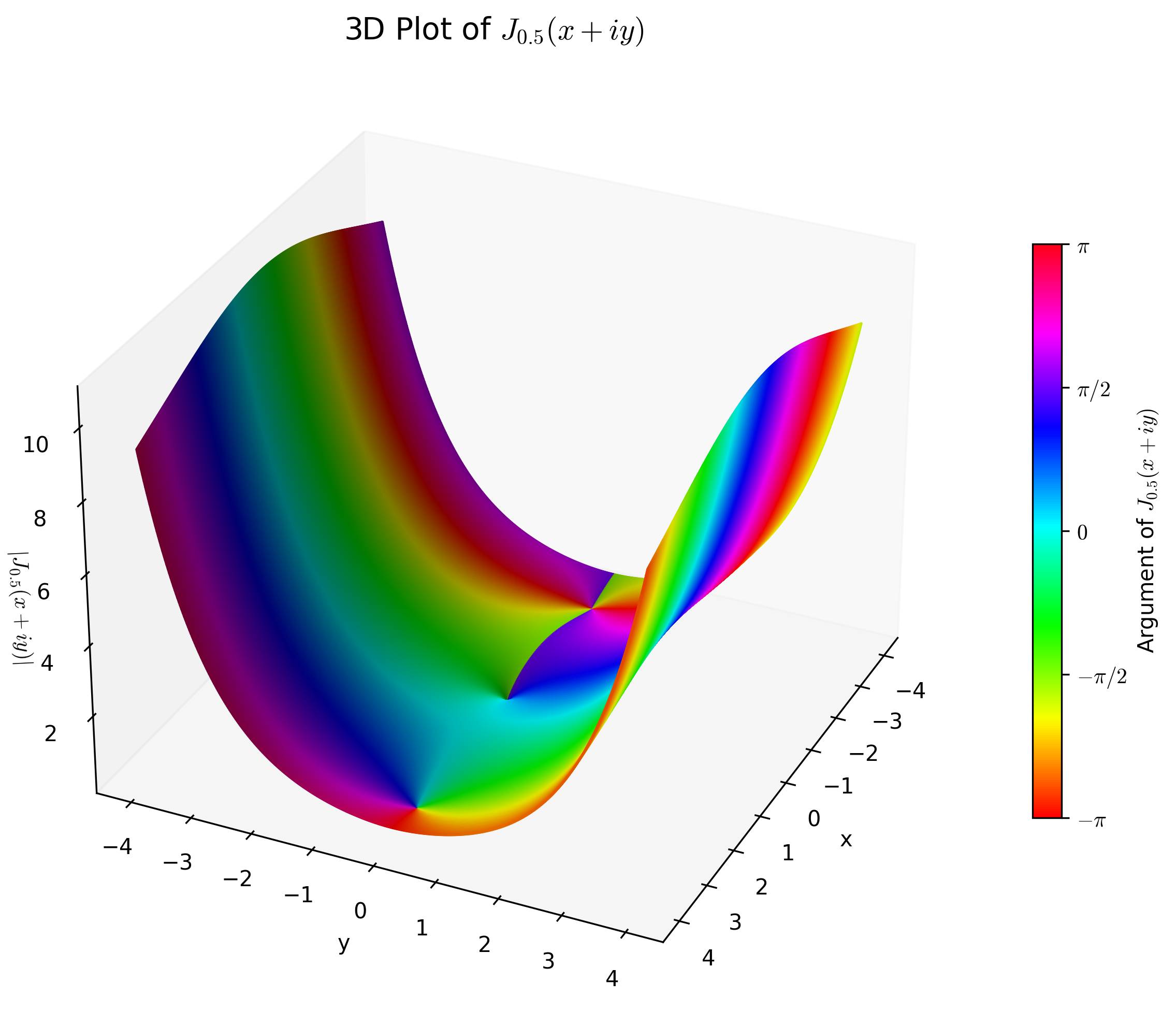
Plot of Bessel function of the first kind $J_\alpha(z)$ with $\alpha=0.5$ in the plane from $-4-4i$ to $4+4i$.

Bessel functions of the first kind, denoted as J_{α}(x), are solutions of Bessel's differential equation. For integer or positive α, Bessel functions of the first kind are finite at the origin (x = 0); while for negative non-integer α, Bessel functions of the first kind diverge as x approaches zero. It is possible to define the function by $x^\alpha$ times a Maclaurin series (note that α need not be an integer, and non-integer powers are not permitted in a Taylor series), which can be found by applying the Frobenius method to Bessel's equation:
$$J_\alpha(x) = \sum_{m=0}^\infty \frac{(-1)^m}{m!\, \Gamma(m+\alpha+1)} {\left(\frac{x}{2}\right)}^{2m + \alpha},$$
where Γ(z) is the gamma function, a shifted generalization of the factorial function to non-integer values. Some earlier authors define the Bessel function of the first kind differently, essentially without the division by $2$ in $x/2$; this definition is not used in this article. The Bessel function of the first kind is an entire function if α is an integer, otherwise it is a multivalued function with singularity at zero. The graphs of Bessel functions look roughly like oscillating sine or cosine functions that decay proportionally to $x^{-{1}/{2}}$ (see also their asymptotic forms below), although their roots are not generally periodic, except asymptotically for large x. (The series indicates that −J_{1}(x) is the derivative of J_{0}(x), much like −sin x is the derivative of cos x; more generally, the derivative of J_{n}(x) can be expressed in terms of J_{n ± 1}(x) by the identities below.)

For non-integer α, the functions J_{α}(x) and J_{−α}(x) are linearly independent, and are therefore the two solutions of the differential equation. On the other hand, for integer order n, the following relationship is valid (the gamma function has simple poles at each of the non-positive integers):
$$J_{-n}(x) = (-1)^n J_n(x).$$

This means that the two solutions are no longer linearly independent. In this case, the second linearly independent solution is then found to be the Bessel function of the second kind, as discussed below.

==== Bessel's integrals ====
Another definition of the Bessel function, for integer values of n, is possible using an integral representation:
$$J_n(x) = \frac{1}{\pi} \int_0^\pi \cos (n \tau - x \sin \tau) \,d\tau = \frac{1}{\pi} \operatorname{Re}\left(\int_{0}^\pi e^{i(n \tau-x \sin \tau )} \,d\tau\right),$$
which is also called Hansen-Bessel formula.

This was the approach that Bessel used, and from this definition he derived several properties of the function. The definition may be extended to non-integer orders by one of Schläfli's integrals, for Re(x) > 0:
$$J_\alpha(x) = \frac{1}{\pi} \int_0^\pi \cos(\alpha\tau - x \sin\tau)\,d\tau - \frac{\sin(\alpha\pi)}{\pi} \int_0^\infty e^{-x \sinh t - \alpha t} \, dt.$$

==== Relation to hypergeometric series ====
The Bessel functions can be expressed in terms of the generalized hypergeometric series as
$$J_\alpha(x) = \frac{\left(\frac{x}{2}\right)^\alpha}{\Gamma(\alpha+1)} \;_0F_1 \left(-;\alpha+1; -\frac{x^2}{4}\right).$$

This expression is related to the development of Bessel functions in terms of the Bessel–Clifford function.

==== Relation to Laguerre polynomials ====
In terms of the Laguerre polynomials L_{k} and arbitrarily chosen parameter t, the Bessel function can be expressed as
$$\frac{J_\alpha(x)}{\left( \frac{x}{2}\right)^\alpha} = \frac{e^{-t}}{\Gamma(\alpha+1)} \sum_{k=0}^\infty \frac{L_k^{(\alpha)}\left( \frac{x^2}{4 t}\right)}{\binom{k+\alpha}{k}} \frac{t^k}{k!}.$$

=== Bessel functions of the second kind: Y_{α} ===
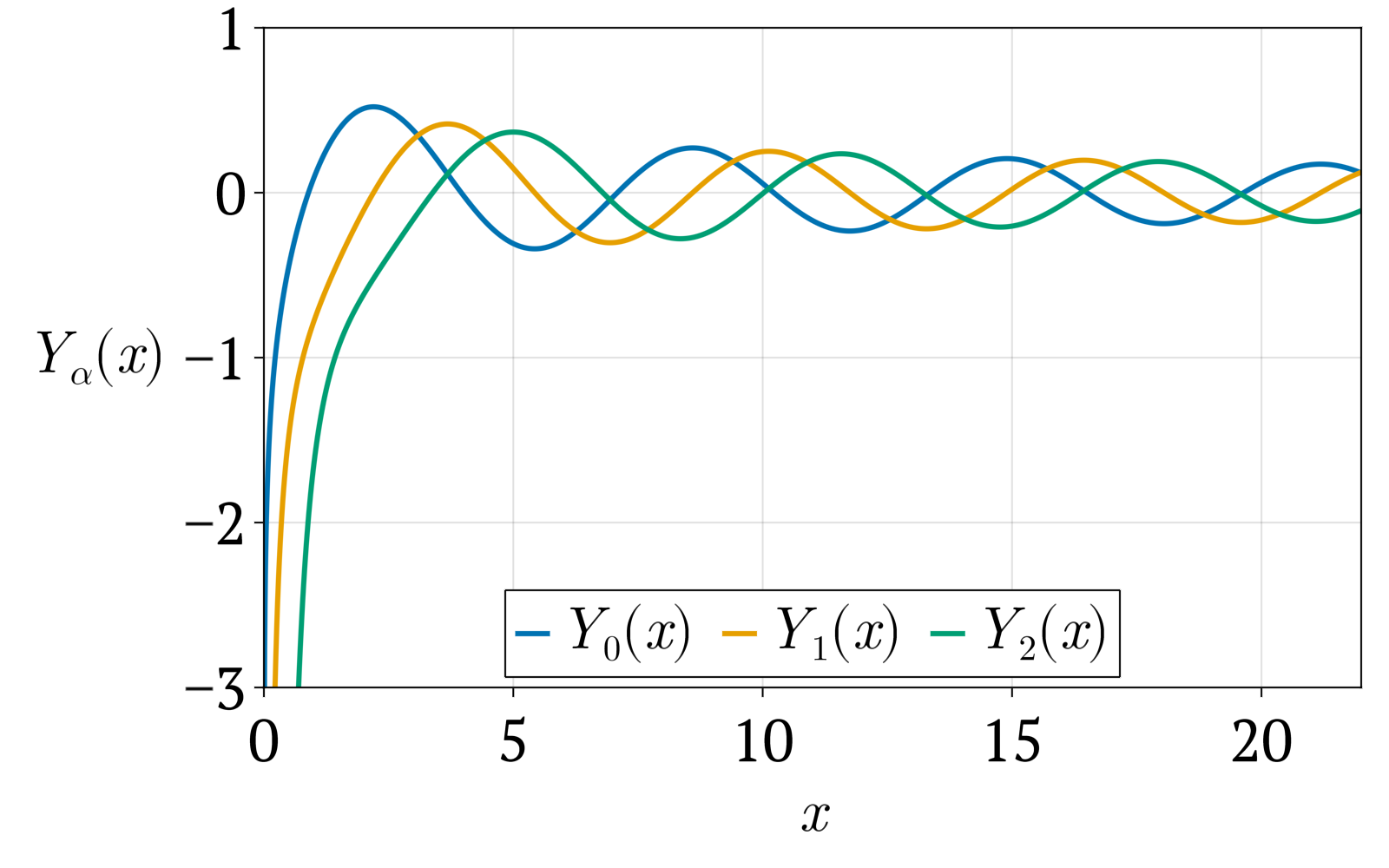
Plot of Bessel function of the second kind, $Y_\alpha(x)$, for integer orders $\alpha = 0, 1, 2$

The Bessel functions of the second kind, denoted by Y_{α}(x), occasionally denoted instead by N_{α}(x), are solutions of the Bessel differential equation that have a singularity at the origin (x = 0) and are multivalued. These are sometimes called Weber functions, as they were introduced by H. M. Weber (1873), and also Neumann functions after Carl Neumann.

For non-integer α, Y_{α}(x) is related to J_{α}(x) by
$$Y_\alpha(x) = \frac{J_\alpha(x) \cos (\alpha \pi) - J_{-\alpha}(x)}{\sin (\alpha \pi)}.$$

In the case of integer order n, the function is defined by taking the limit as a non-integer α tends to n:
$$Y_n(x) = \lim_{\alpha \to n} Y_\alpha(x).$$

If n is a nonnegative integer, we have the series
$$Y_n(z) =-\frac{\left(\frac{z}{2}\right)^{-n}}{\pi}\sum_{k=0}^{n-1} \frac{(n-k-1)!}{k!}\left(\frac{z^2}{4}\right)^k +\frac{2}{\pi} J_n(z) \ln \frac{z}{2} -\frac{\left(\frac{z}{2}\right)^n}{\pi}\sum_{k=0}^\infty (\psi(k+1)+\psi(n+k+1)) \frac{\left(-\frac{z^2}{4}\right)^k}{k!(n+k)!}$$
where $\psi(z)$ is the digamma function, the logarithmic derivative of the gamma function.

There is also a corresponding integral formula (for Re(x) > 0):
$$Y_n(x) = \frac{1}{\pi} \int_0^\pi \sin(x \sin\theta - n\theta) \, d\theta -\frac{1}{\pi} \int_0^\infty \left(e^{nt} + (-1)^n e^{-nt} \right) e^{-x \sinh t} \, dt.$$

In the case where n = 0: (with $\gamma$ being Euler's constant)
$$Y_{0}\left(x\right)=\frac{4}{\pi^{2}}\int_{0}^{\frac{1}{2}\pi}\cos\left(x\cos\theta\right)\left(\gamma+\ln\left(2x\sin^2\theta\right)\right)\, d\theta.$$

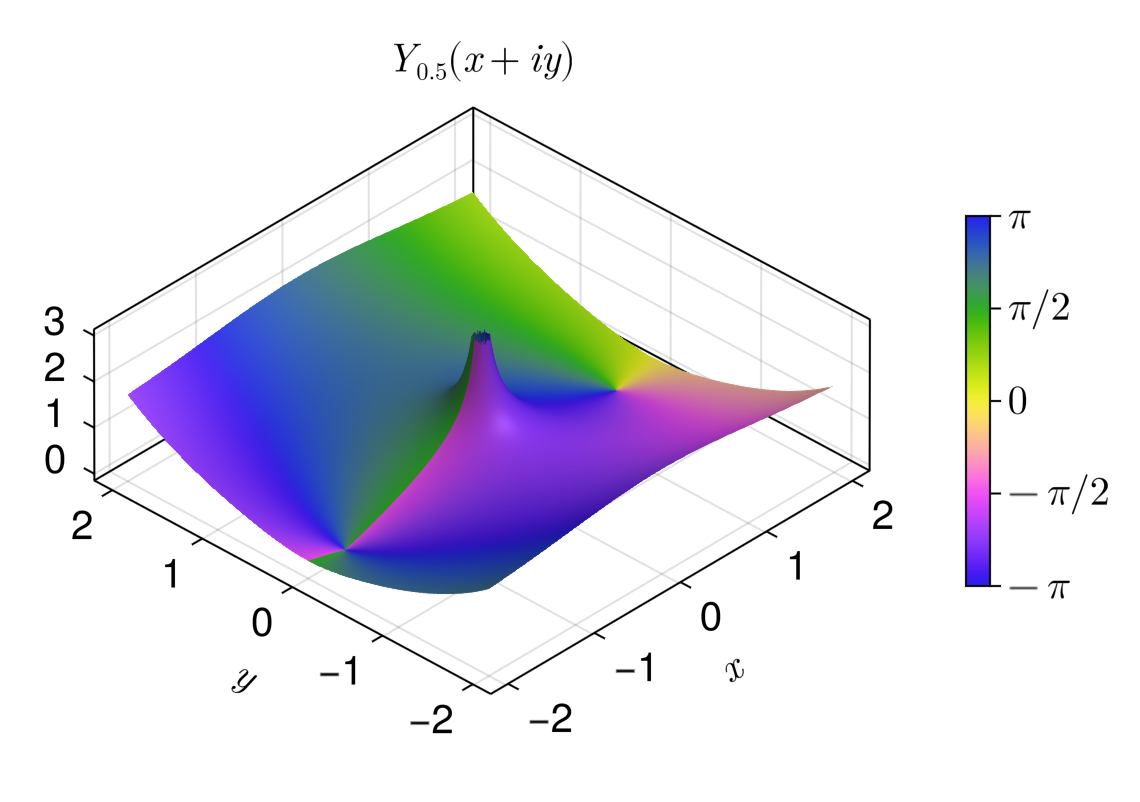
Plot of the Bessel function of the second kind $Y_\alpha(z)$ with $\alpha = 0.5$ in the complex plane from $-2 -2i$ to $2 + 2i$.

Y_{α}(x) is necessary as the second linearly independent solution of the Bessel's equation when α is an integer. But Y_{α}(x) has more meaning than that. It can be considered as a "natural" partner of J_{α}(x). See also the subsection on Hankel functions below.

When α is an integer, moreover, as was similarly the case for the functions of the first kind, the following relationship is valid:
$$Y_{-n}(x) = (-1)^n Y_n(x).$$

Both J_{α}(x) and Y_{α}(x) are holomorphic functions of x on the complex plane cut along the negative real axis. When α is an integer, the Bessel functions J are entire functions of x. If x is held fixed at a non-zero value, then the Bessel functions are entire functions of α.

The Bessel functions of the second kind, when α is an integer, are an example of the second kind of solution in Fuchs's theorem.

=== Hankel functions: H^{(1)}_{α}, H^{(2)}_{α} ===
Plot of the Hankel function of the first kind H^{(1)}_{n}(x) with n = −0.5 in the complex plane from −2 − 2i to 2 + 2i

Plot of the Hankel function of the second kind H^{(2)}_{n}(x) with n = −0.5 in the complex plane from −2 − 2i to 2 + 2i

Another important formulation of the two linearly independent solutions to Bessel's equation are the Hankel functions of the first and second kind, H^{(1)}_{α}(x) and H^{(2)}_{α}(x), defined as
$$\begin{align}
H_\alpha^{(1)}(x) &= J_\alpha(x) + iY_\alpha(x), \\[5pt]
H_\alpha^{(2)}(x) &= J_\alpha(x) - iY_\alpha(x),
\end{align}$$
where i is the imaginary unit. These linear combinations are also known as Bessel functions of the third kind; they are two linearly independent solutions of Bessel's differential equation. They are named after Hermann Hankel.

These forms of linear combination satisfy numerous simple-looking properties, like asymptotic formulae or integral representations. Here, "simple" means an appearance of a factor of the form e^{i f(x)}. For real $x>0$ where $J_\alpha(x)$, $Y_\alpha(x)$ are real-valued, the Bessel functions of the first and second kind are the real and imaginary parts, respectively, of the first Hankel function and the real and negative imaginary parts of the second Hankel function. Thus, the above formulae are analogs of Euler's formula, substituting H^{(1)}_{α}(x), H^{(2)}_{α}(x) for $e^{\pm i x}$ and $J_\alpha(x)$, $Y_\alpha(x)$ for $\cos(x)$, $\sin(x)$, as explicitly shown in the asymptotic expansion.

The Hankel functions are used to express outward- and inward-propagating cylindrical-wave solutions of the cylindrical wave equation, respectively (or vice versa, depending on the sign convention for the frequency).

Using the previous relationships, they can be expressed as
$$\begin{align}
H_\alpha^{(1)}(x) &= \frac{J_{-\alpha}(x) - e^{-\alpha \pi i} J_\alpha(x)}{i \sin \alpha\pi}, \\[5pt]
H_\alpha^{(2)}(x) &= \frac{J_{-\alpha}(x) - e^{\alpha \pi i} J_\alpha(x)}{- i \sin \alpha\pi}.
\end{align}$$

If α is an integer, the limit has to be calculated. The following relationships are valid, whether α is an integer or not:
$$\begin{align}
H_{-\alpha}^{(1)}(x) &= e^{\alpha \pi i} H_\alpha^{(1)} (x), \\[6mu]
H_{-\alpha}^{(2)}(x) &= e^{-\alpha \pi i} H_\alpha^{(2)} (x).
\end{align}$$

In particular, if α = m + 1/2 with m a nonnegative integer, the above relations imply directly that
$$\begin{align}
J_{-(m+\frac{1}{2})}(x) &= (-1)^{m+1} Y_{m+\frac{1}{2}}(x), \\[5pt]
Y_{-(m+\frac{1}{2})}(x) &= (-1)^m J_{m+\frac{1}{2}}(x).
\end{align}$$

These are useful in developing the spherical Bessel functions (see below).

The Hankel functions admit the following integral representations for Re(x) > 0:
$$\begin{align}
H_\alpha^{(1)}(x) &= \frac{1}{\pi i}\int_{-\infty}^{+\infty + \pi i} e^{x\sinh t - \alpha t} \, dt, \\[5pt]
H_\alpha^{(2)}(x) &= -\frac{1}{\pi i}\int_{-\infty}^{+\infty - \pi i} e^{x\sinh t - \alpha t} \, dt,
\end{align}$$
where the integration limits indicate integration along a contour that can be chosen as follows: from −∞ to 0 along the negative real axis, from 0 to ±πi along the imaginary axis, and from ±πi to +∞ ± πi along a contour parallel to the real axis.

=== Modified Bessel functions: I_{α}, K_{α} ===
The Bessel functions are valid even for complex arguments x, and an important special case is that of a purely imaginary argument. In this case, the solutions to the Bessel equation are called the modified Bessel functions (or occasionally the hyperbolic Bessel functions) of the first and second kind and are defined as
$$\begin{align}
I_\alpha(x) &= i^{-\alpha} J_\alpha(ix) = \sum_{m=0}^\infty \frac{1}{m!\, \Gamma(m+\alpha+1)}\left(\frac{x}{2}\right)^{2m+\alpha}, \\[5pt]
K_\alpha(x) &= \frac{\pi}{2} \frac{I_{-\alpha}(x) - I_\alpha(x)}{\sin \alpha \pi},
\end{align}$$
when α is not an integer. When α is an integer, then the limit is used. These are chosen to be real-valued for real and positive arguments x. The series expansion for I_{α}(x) is thus similar to that for J_{α}(x), but without the alternating (−1)^{m} factor.

$K_{\alpha}$ can be expressed in terms of Hankel functions:
$$K_{\alpha}(x) = \begin{cases}
\frac{\pi}{2} i^{\alpha+1} H_\alpha^{(1)}(ix) & -\pi < \arg x \leq \frac{\pi}{2} \\
\frac{\pi}{2} (-i)^{\alpha+1} H_\alpha^{(2)}(-ix) & -\frac{\pi}{2} < \arg x \leq \pi
\end{cases}$$

Using these two formulae the result to $J_{\alpha}^2(z) + Y_{\alpha}^2(z)$, commonly known as Nicholson's integral or Nicholson's formula, can be obtained to give the following
$$J_{\alpha}^2(x)+Y_{\alpha}^2(x)=\frac{8}{\pi^2}\int_{0}^{\infty}\cosh(2\alpha t)K_0(2x\sinh t)\, dt,$$

given that the condition Re(x) > 0 is met. It can also be shown that
$$J_\alpha^2(x)+Y_{\alpha}^2(x)=\frac{8\cos(\alpha\pi)}{\pi^2} \int_0^\infty K_{2\alpha}(2x\sinh t)\, dt,$$
only when |Re(α)| < 1/2 and Re(x) ≥ 0 but not when x = 0.

We can express the first and second Bessel functions in terms of the modified Bessel functions (these are valid if −π < arg z ≤ π/2):
$$\begin{align}
J_\alpha(iz) &= e^{\frac{\alpha\pi i}{2}} I_\alpha(z), \\[1ex]
Y_\alpha(iz) &= e^{\frac{(\alpha+1)\pi i}{2}}I_\alpha(z) - \tfrac{2}{\pi} e^{-\frac{\alpha\pi i}{2}}K_\alpha(z).
\end{align}$$

I_{α}(x) and K_{α}(x) are the two linearly independent solutions to the modified Bessel's equation:
$$x^2 \frac{d^2 y}{dx^2} + x \frac{dy}{dx} - \left(x^2 + \alpha^2 \right)y = 0.$$

Unlike the ordinary Bessel functions, which are oscillating as functions of a real argument, I_{α} and K_{α} are exponentially growing and decaying functions respectively. Like the ordinary Bessel function J_{α}, the function I_{α} goes to zero at x = 0 for α > 0 and is finite at x = 0 for α = 0. Analogously, K_{α} diverges at x = 0 with the singularity being of logarithmic type for K_{0}, and 1/2Γ(|α|)(2/x)^{|α|} otherwise.

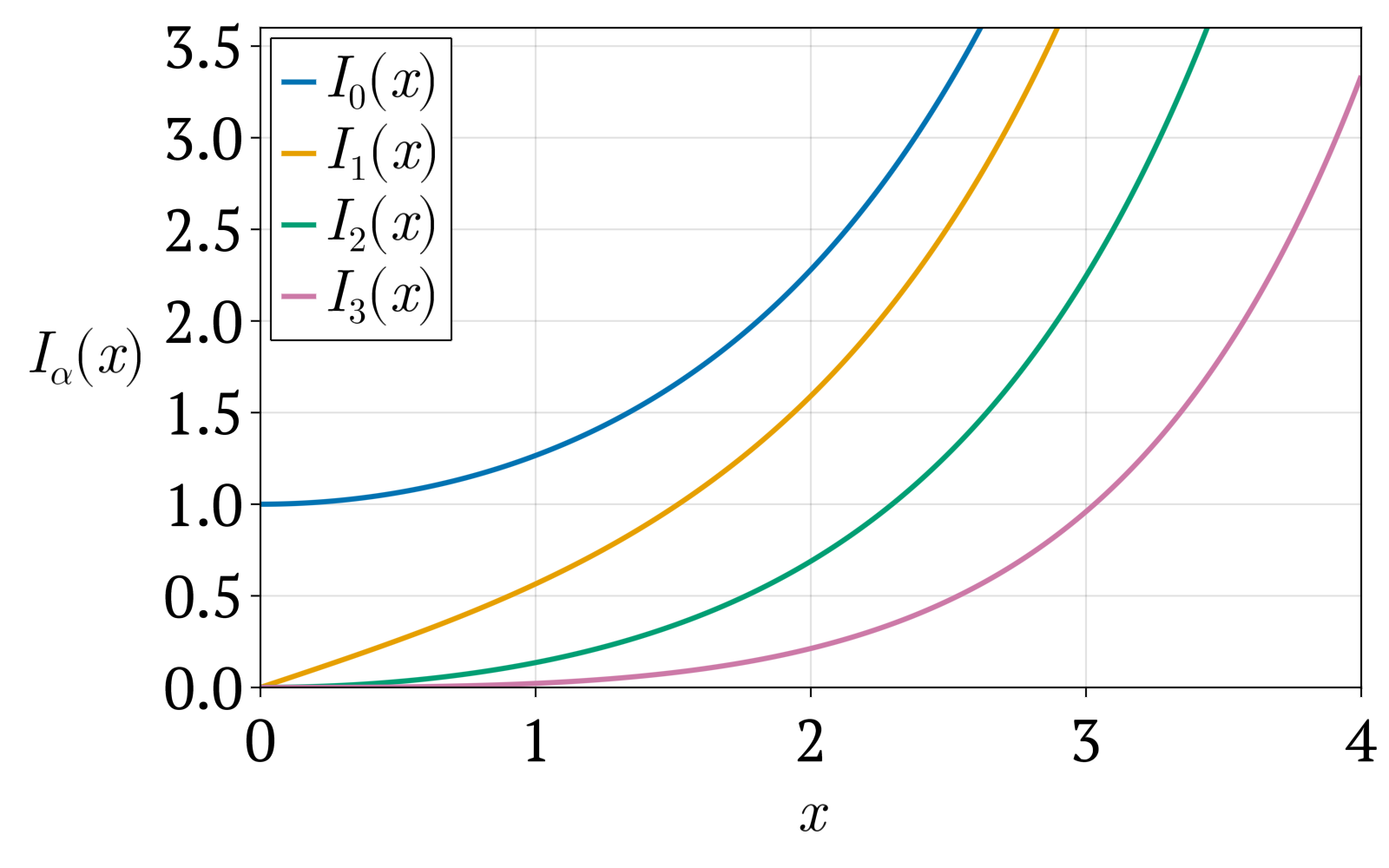
Modified Bessel functions of the first kind, $I_\alpha(x)$, for $\alpha = 0, 1, 2, 3$.

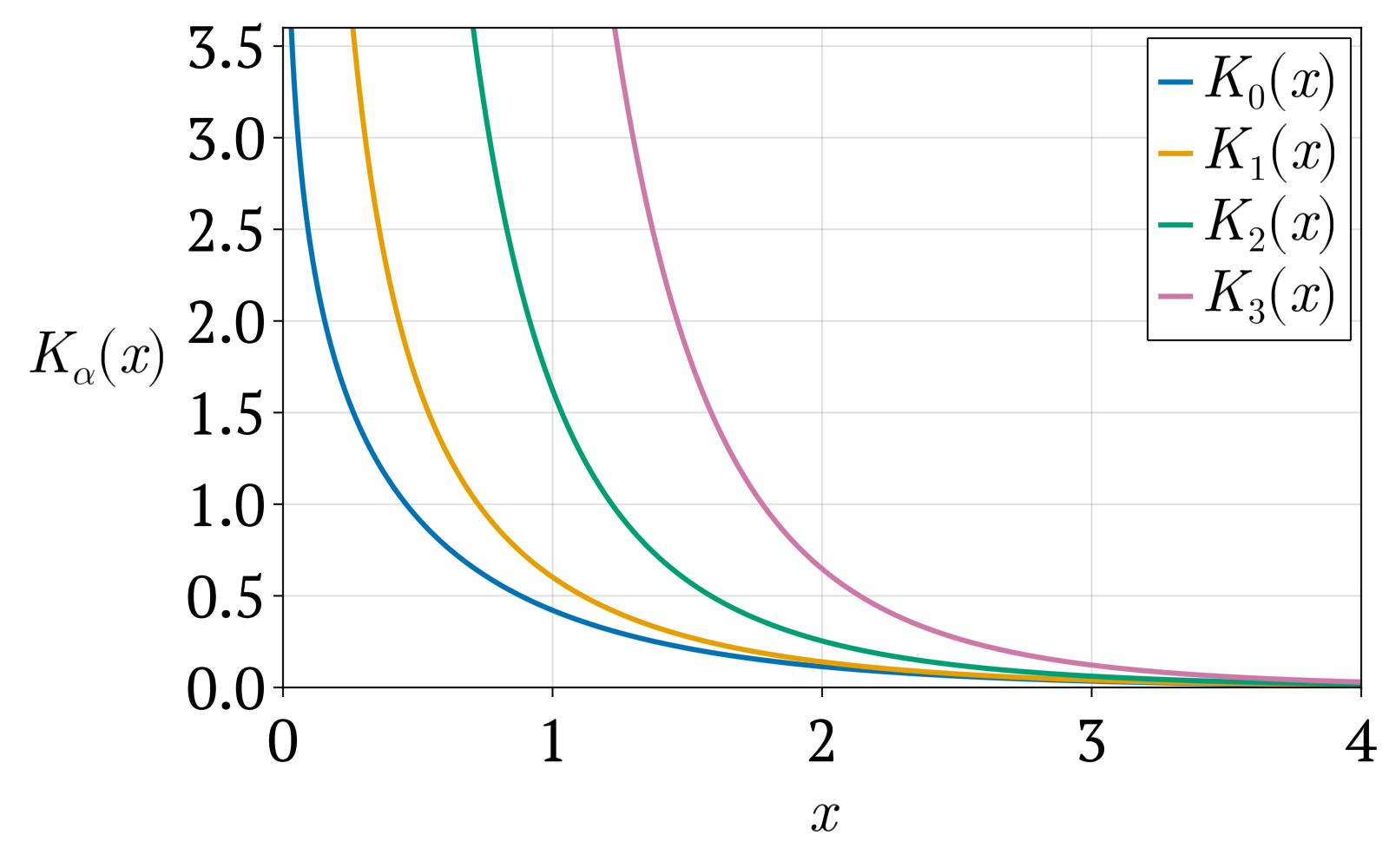
Modified Bessel functions of the second kind, $K_\alpha(x)$, for $\alpha = 0, 1, 2, 3$.

Two integral formulas for the modified Bessel functions are (for Re(x) > 0):
$$\begin{align}
I_\alpha(x) &= \frac{1}{\pi}\int_0^\pi e^{x\cos \theta} \cos \alpha\theta \,d\theta - \frac{\sin \alpha\pi}{\pi}\int_0^\infty e^{-x\cosh t - \alpha t} \,dt, \\[5pt]
K_\alpha(x) &= \int_0^\infty e^{-x\cosh t} \cosh \alpha t \,dt.
\end{align}$$

Bessel functions can be described as Fourier transforms of powers of quadratic functions. For example (for Re(ω) > 0):
$$2\,K_0(\omega) = \int_{-\infty}^\infty \frac{e^{i\omega t}}{\sqrt{t^2+1}} \,dt.$$

It can be proven by showing equality to the above integral definition for K_{0}. This is done by integrating a closed curve in the first quadrant of the complex plane.

Modified Bessel functions of the second kind may be represented with Bassett's integral
$$K_n(xz) = \frac{\Gamma{\left(n+\frac{1}{2}\right)}(2z)^{n}}{\sqrt{\pi} x^{n}} \int_0^\infty \frac{\cos (xt)\,dt}{(t^2+z^2)^{n+\frac{1}{2}}}.$$

Modified Bessel functions K_{1/3} and K_{2/3} can be represented in terms of rapidly convergent integrals
$$\begin{align}
K_{\frac{1}{3}}(\xi) &= \sqrt{3} \int_0^\infty \exp \left(- \xi \left(1+\frac{4x^2}{3}\right) \sqrt{1+\frac{x^2}{3}} \right) \,dx, \\[5pt]
K_{\frac{2}{3}}(\xi) &= \frac{1}{\sqrt{3}} \int_0^\infty \frac{3+2x^2}{\sqrt{1+\frac{x^2}{3}}} \exp \left(- \xi \left(1+\frac{4x^2}{3}\right) \sqrt{1+\frac{x^2}{3}}\right) \,dx.
\end{align}$$

The modified Bessel function $K_{\frac{1}{2}}(\xi)=(2 \xi / \pi)^{-1/2}\exp(-\xi)$ is useful to represent the Laplace distribution as an Exponential-scale mixture of normal distributions.

The modified Bessel function of the second kind has also been called by the following names (now rare):

- Basset function after Alfred Barnard Basset
- Modified Bessel function of the third kind
- Modified Hankel function
- Macdonald function after Hector Munro Macdonald

=== Spherical Bessel functions: j_{n}, y_{n} ===
Plot of the spherical Bessel function of the first kind j_{n}(z) with n = 0.5 in the complex plane from −2 − 2i to 2 + 2i

Plot of the spherical Bessel function of the second kind y_{n}(z) with n = 0.5 in the complex plane from −2 − 2i to 2 + 2i

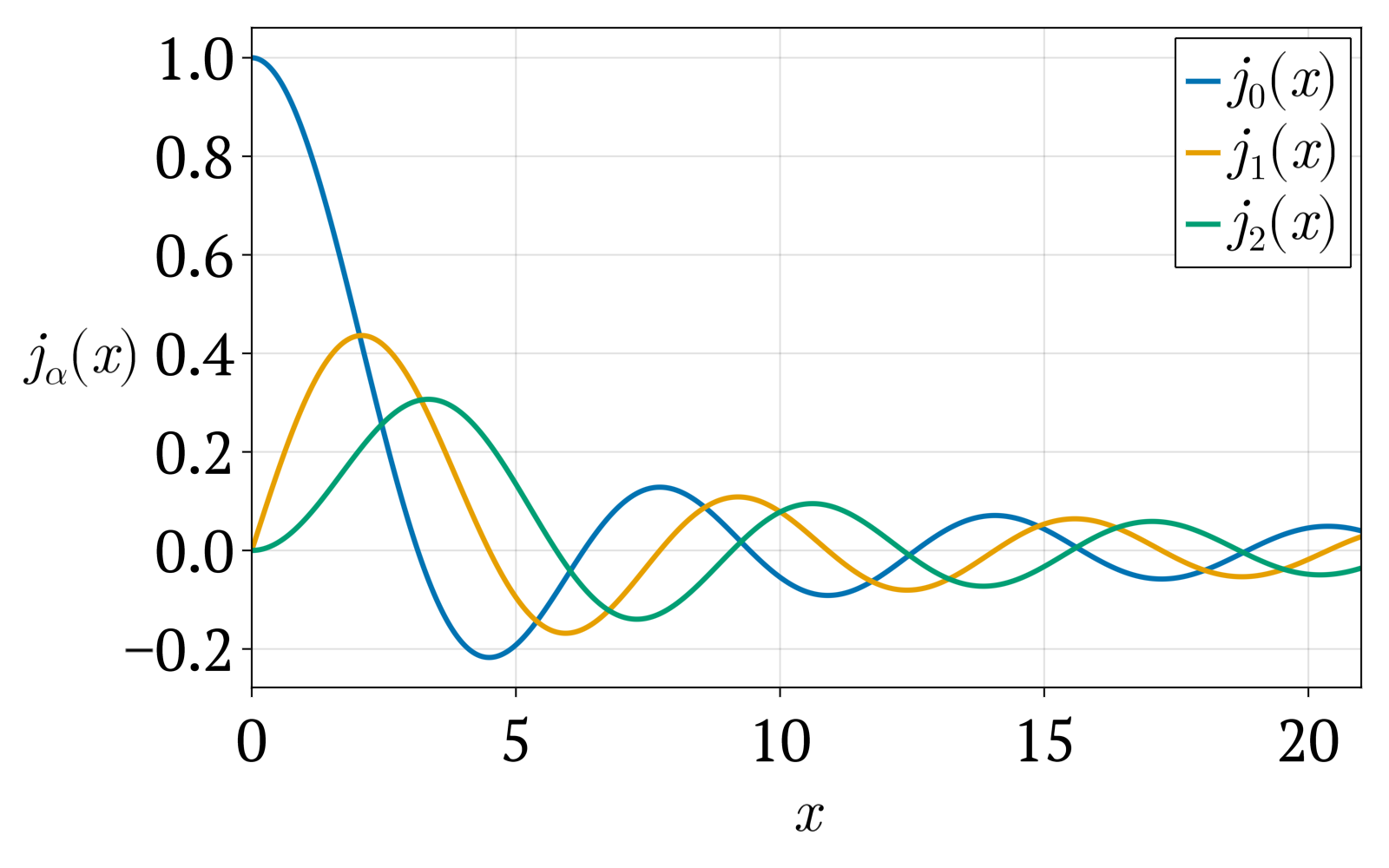
Spherical Bessel functions of the first kind $j_\alpha(x)$, for $\alpha = 0,1,2$.

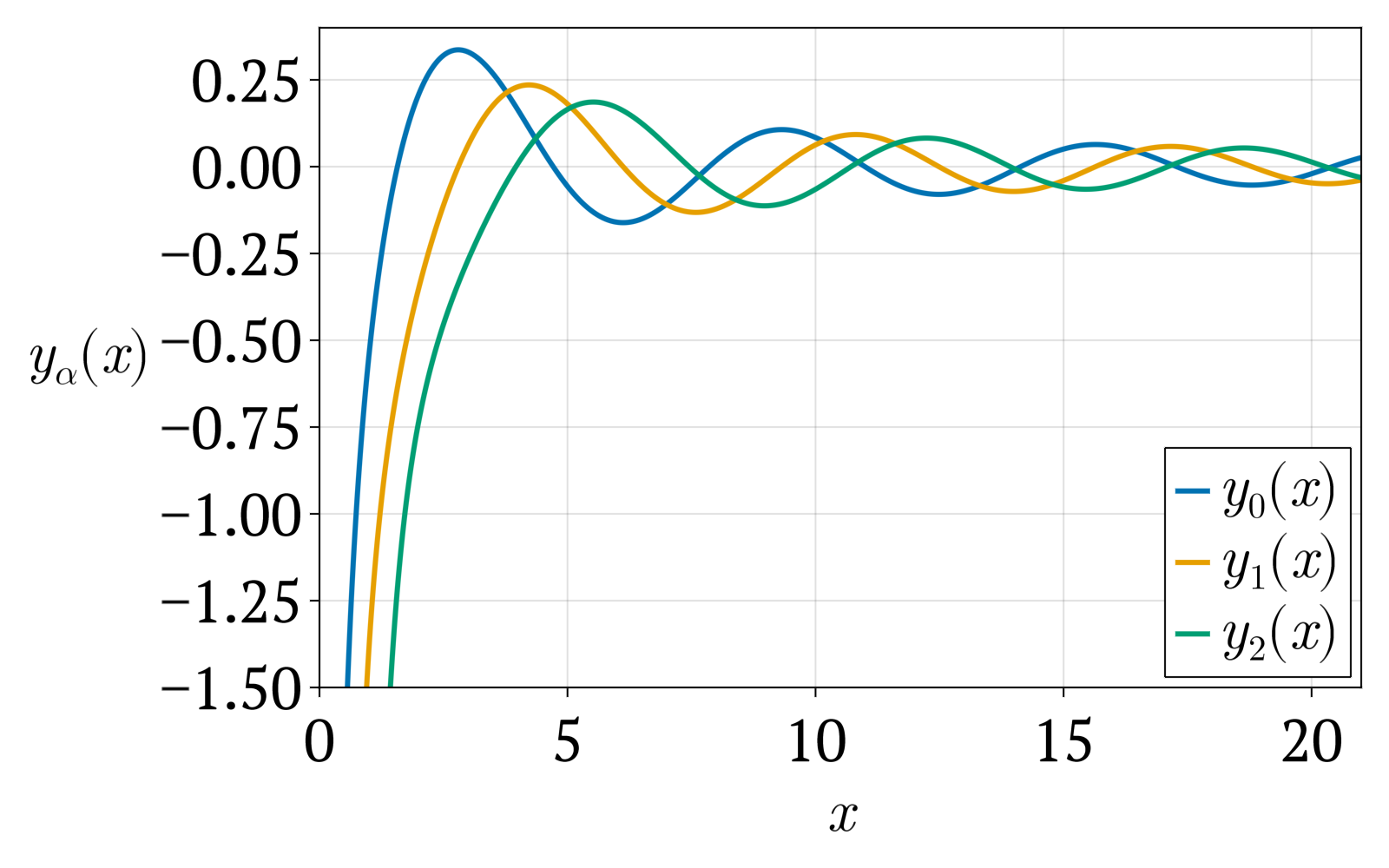
Spherical Bessel functions of the second kind $y_\alpha(x)$, for $\alpha = 0,1,2$.

When solving the Helmholtz equation in spherical coordinates by separation of variables, the radial equation has the form
$$x^2 \frac{d^2 y}{dx^2} + 2x \frac{d y}{dx} +\left(x^2 - n(n + 1)\right) y = 0.$$

The two linearly independent solutions to this equation are called the spherical Bessel functions j_{n} and y_{n}, and are related to the ordinary Bessel functions J_{n} and Y_{n} by
$$\begin{align}
j_n(x) &= \sqrt{\frac{\pi}{2x}} J_{n+\frac{1}{2}}(x), \\
y_n(x) &= \sqrt{\frac{\pi}{2x}} Y_{n+\frac{1}{2}}(x) = (-1)^{n+1} \sqrt{\frac{\pi}{2x}} J_{-n-\frac{1}{2}}(x).
\end{align}$$

y_{n} is also denoted n_{n} or η_{n}; some authors call these functions the spherical Neumann functions.

From the relations to the ordinary Bessel functions it is directly seen that:
$$\begin{align}
j_n(x) &= (-1)^{n} y_{-n-1} (x)
\\
y_n(x) &= (-1)^{n+1} j_{-n-1}(x)
\end{align}$$

The spherical Bessel functions can also be written as (Rayleigh's formulas)
$$\begin{align}
j_n(x) &= (-x)^n \left(\frac{1}{x}\frac{d}{dx}\right)^n \frac{\sin x}{x}, \\
y_n(x) &= -(-x)^n \left(\frac{1}{x}\frac{d}{dx}\right)^n \frac{\cos x}{x}.
\end{align}$$

The zeroth spherical Bessel function j_{0}(x) is also known as the (unnormalized) sinc function. The first few spherical Bessel functions are:
$$\begin{align}
j_0(x) &= \frac{\sin x}{x}. \\
j_1(x) &= \frac{\sin x}{x^2} - \frac{\cos x}{x}, \\
j_2(x) &= \left(\frac{3}{x^2} - 1\right) \frac{\sin x}{x} - \frac{3\cos x}{x^2}, \\
j_3(x) &= \left(\frac{15}{x^3} - \frac{6}{x}\right) \frac{\sin x}{x} - \left(\frac{15}{x^2} - 1\right) \frac{\cos x}{x}
\end{align}$$
and
$$\begin{align}
y_0(x) &= -j_{-1}(x) = -\frac{\cos x}{x}, \\
y_1(x) &= j_{-2}(x)  = -\frac{\cos x}{x^2} - \frac{\sin x}{x}, \\
y_2(x) &= -j_{-3}(x) = \left(-\frac{3}{x^2} + 1\right) \frac{\cos x}{x} - \frac{3\sin x}{x^2}, \\
y_3(x) &= j_{-4}(x)  = \left(-\frac{15}{x^3} + \frac{6}{x}\right) \frac{\cos x}{x} - \left(\frac{15}{x^2} - 1\right) \frac{\sin x}{x}.
\end{align}$$

The first few non-zero roots of the first few spherical Bessel functions are:

Non-zero Roots of the Spherical Bessel Function (first kind)
Order	Root 1	Root 2	Root 3	Root 4	Root 5
$j_{0}$	3.141593	6.283185	9.424778	12.566371	15.707963
$j_{1}$	4.493409	7.725252	10.904122	14.066194	17.220755
$j_{2}$	5.763459	9.095011	12.322941	15.514603	18.689036
$j_{3}$	6.987932	10.417119	13.698023	16.923621	20.121806
$j_{4}$	8.182561	11.704907	15.039665	18.301256	21.525418

Non-zero Roots of the Spherical Bessel Function (second kind)
Order	Root 1	Root 2	Root 3	Root 4	Root 5
$y_{0}$	1.570796	4.712389	7.853982	10.995574	14.137167
$y_{1}$	2.798386	6.121250	9.317866	12.486454	15.644128
$y_{2}$	3.959528	7.451610	10.715647	13.921686	17.103359
$y_{3}$	5.088498	8.733710	12.067544	15.315390	18.525210
$y_{4}$	6.197831	9.982466	13.385287	16.676625	19.916796

==== Generating function ====
The spherical Bessel functions have the generating functions
$$\begin{align}
\frac{1}{z} \cos \left(\sqrt{z^2 - 2zt}\right) &= \sum_{n=0}^\infty \frac{t^n}{n!} j_{n-1}(z), \\
\frac{1}{z} \sin \left(\sqrt{z^2 - 2zt}\right) &= \sum_{n=0}^\infty \frac{t^n}{n!} y_{n-1}(z).
\end{align}$$

==== Finite series expansions ====
In contrast to the whole integer Bessel functions J_{n}(x), Y_{n}(x), the spherical Bessel functions j_{n}(x), y_{n}(x) have a finite series expression:
$$\begin{alignat}{2}
j_n(x) &= \sqrt{\frac{\pi}{2x}}J_{n+\frac{1}{2}}(x) \\
&= \frac{1}{2x} \left[ e^{ix} \sum_{r=0}^n \frac{i^{r-n-1}(n+r)!}{r!(n-r)!(2x)^r} + e^{-ix} \sum_{r=0}^n \frac{(-i)^{r-n-1}(n+r)!}{r!(n-r)!(2x)^r} \right] \\
&= \frac{1}{x} \left[ \sin\left(x-\frac{n\pi}{2}\right) \sum_{r=0}^{\left \lfloor \frac{n}{2} \right \rfloor} \frac{(-1)^r (n+2r)!}{(2r)!(n-2r)!(2x)^{2r}} + \cos\left(x-\frac{n\pi}{2}\right) \sum_{r=0}^{\left \lfloor \frac{n-1}{2} \right \rfloor} \frac{(-1)^r (n+2r+1)!}{(2r+1)!(n-2r-1)!(2x)^{2r+1}} \right] \\
\end{alignat}$$
$$\begin{alignat}{2}
y_n(x) &= (-1)^{n+1} j_{-n-1}(x) = (-1)^{n+1} \frac{\pi}{2x}J_{-\left(n+\frac{1}{2}\right)}(x) \\
&= \frac{(-1)^{n+1}}{2x} \left[ e^{ix} \sum_{r=0}^n \frac{i^{r+n}(n+r)!}{r!(n-r)!(2x)^r} + e^{-ix} \sum_{r=0}^n \frac{(-i)^{r+n}(n+r)!}{r!(n-r)!(2x)^r} \right] \\
&= \frac{(-1)^{n+1}}{x} \left[ \cos\left(x+\frac{n\pi}{2}\right) \sum_{r=0}^{\left \lfloor \frac{n}{2} \right \rfloor} \frac{(-1)^r (n+2r)!}{(2r)!(n-2r)!(2x)^{2r}} - \sin\left(x+\frac{n\pi}{2}\right) \sum_{r=0}^{\left \lfloor \frac{n-1}{2} \right \rfloor} \frac{(-1)^r (n+2r+1)!}{(2r+1)!(n-2r-1)!(2x)^{2r+1}} \right]
\end{alignat}$$

==== Differential relations ====
In the following, f_{n} is any of j_{n}, y_{n}, h^{(1)}_{n}, h^{(2)}_{n} for n = 0, ±1, ±2, ...
$$\begin{align}
\left(\frac{1}{z}\frac{d}{dz}\right)^m \left (z^{n+1} f_n(z)\right ) &= z^{n-m+1} f_{n-m}(z), \\
\left(\frac{1}{z}\frac{d}{dz}\right)^m \left (z^{-n} f_n(z)\right ) &= (-1)^m z^{-n-m} f_{n+m}(z).
\end{align}$$

=== Spherical Hankel functions: h^{(1)}_{n}, h^{(2)}_{n} ===
Plot of the spherical Hankel function of the first kind h^{(1)}_{n}(x) with n = −0.5 in the complex plane from −2 − 2i to 2 + 2i

Plot of the spherical Hankel function of the second kind h^{(2)}_{n}(x) with n = −0.5 in the complex plane from −2 − 2i to 2 + 2i

There are also spherical analogues of the Hankel functions:
$$\begin{align}
h_n^{(1)}(x) &= j_n(x) + i y_n(x), \\
h_n^{(2)}(x) &= j_n(x) - i y_n(x).
\end{align}$$

There are simple closed-form expressions for the Bessel functions of half-integer order in terms of the standard trigonometric functions, and therefore for the spherical Bessel functions. In particular, for non-negative integers n:
$$h_n^{(1)}(x) = (-i)^{n+1} \frac{e^{ix}}{x} \sum_{m=0}^n \frac{i^m}{m!\,(2x)^m} \frac{(n+m)!}{(n-m)!},$$
and h^{(2)}_{n} is the complex-conjugate of this (for real x). It follows, for example, that j_{0}(x) = (sin x)/x and y_{0}(x) = −(cos x)/x, and so on.

The spherical Hankel functions appear in problems involving spherical wave propagation, for example in the multipole expansion of the electromagnetic field.

=== Riccati–Bessel functions: S_{n}, C_{n}, ξ_{n}, ζ_{n} ===
Riccati–Bessel functions only slightly differ from spherical Bessel functions:
$$\begin{align}
S_n(x)     &= x j_n(x) = \sqrt{\frac{\pi x}{2}} J_{n+\frac{1}{2}}(x) \\
C_n(x)     &= -x y_n(x) = -\sqrt{\frac{\pi x}{2}} Y_{n+\frac{1}{2}}(x) \\
\xi_n(x)   &= x h_n^{(1)}(x) = \sqrt{\frac{\pi x}{2}} H_{n+\frac{1}{2}}^{(1)}(x) = S_n(x) - iC_n(x) \\
\zeta_n(x) &= x h_n^{(2)}(x) = \sqrt{\frac{\pi x}{2}} H_{n+\frac{1}{2}}^{(2)}(x) = S_n(x) + iC_n(x)
\end{align}$$

Riccati–Bessel functions Sn complex plot from −2 − 2i to 2 + 2i

They satisfy the differential equation
$$x^2 \frac{d^2 y}{dx^2} + \left (x^2 - n(n + 1)\right) y = 0.$$

For example, this kind of differential equation appears in quantum mechanics while solving the radial component of the Schrödinger equation with hypothetical cylindrical infinite potential barrier. This differential equation, and the Riccati–Bessel solutions, also arises in the problem of scattering of electromagnetic waves by a sphere, known as Mie scattering after the first published solution by Mie (1908). See e.g., Du (2004) for recent developments and references.

Following Debye (1909), the notation ψ_{n}, χ_{n} is sometimes used instead of S_{n}, C_{n}.

== Asymptotic forms ==
The Bessel functions have the following asymptotic forms. For small arguments $0<z\ll\sqrt{\alpha+1}$, one obtains, when $\alpha$ is not a negative integer:
$$J_\alpha(z) \sim \frac{1}{\Gamma(\alpha+1)} \left( \frac{z}{2} \right)^\alpha.$$

When α is a negative integer, we have
$$J_\alpha(z) \sim \frac{(-1)^{\alpha}}{(-\alpha)!} \left( \frac{2}{z} \right)^\alpha.$$

For the Bessel function of the second kind we have three cases:
$$Y_\alpha(z) \sim \begin{cases}
\dfrac{2}{\pi} \left( \ln \left(\dfrac{z}{2} \right) + \gamma \right) & \text{if } \alpha = 0 \\[1ex]
-\dfrac{\Gamma(\alpha)}{\pi} \left( \dfrac{2}{z} \right)^\alpha + \dfrac{1}{\Gamma(\alpha+1)} \left(\dfrac{z}{2} \right)^\alpha \cot(\alpha \pi) & \text{if } \alpha \text{ is a positive integer,} \\[1ex]
-\dfrac{(-1)^\alpha\Gamma(-\alpha)}{\pi} \left( \dfrac{z}{2} \right)^\alpha & \text{if } \alpha\text{ is a negative integer,}
\end{cases}$$
where γ is the Euler–Mascheroni constant (0.5772...). For the second case (where $\alpha$ is a positive integer) one term will dominate unless $\alpha$ is imaginary.

For large real arguments z ≫ |α^{2} − 1/4|, one cannot write a true asymptotic form for Bessel functions of the first and second kind (unless α is half-integer) because they have zeros all the way out to infinity, which would have to be matched exactly by any asymptotic expansion. However, for a given value of arg z one can write an equation containing a term of order |z|^{−1}:
$$\begin{align}
J_\alpha(z) &= \sqrt{\frac{2}{\pi z}}\left(\cos \left(z-\frac{\alpha\pi}{2} - \frac{\pi}{4}\right) + e^{\left|\operatorname{Im}(z)\right|}\mathcal{O}\left(|z|^{-1}\right)\right) && \text{for } \left|\arg z\right| < \pi, \\
Y_\alpha(z) &= \sqrt{\frac{2}{\pi z}}\left(\sin \left(z-\frac{\alpha\pi}{2} - \frac{\pi}{4}\right) + e^{\left|\operatorname{Im}(z)\right|}\mathcal{O}\left(|z|^{-1}\right)\right) && \text{for } \left|\arg z\right| < \pi.
\end{align}$$

(For α = 1/2, the last terms in these formulas drop out completely; see the spherical Bessel functions above.)

The asymptotic forms for the Hankel functions are:
$$\begin{align}
H_\alpha^{(1)}(z) &\sim \sqrt{\frac{2}{\pi z}}e^{i\left(z-\frac{\alpha\pi}{2}-\frac{\pi}{4}\right)} && \text{for } -\pi < \arg z < 2\pi, \\
H_\alpha^{(2)}(z) &\sim \sqrt{\frac{2}{\pi z}}e^{-i\left(z-\frac{\alpha\pi}{2}-\frac{\pi}{4}\right)} && \text{for } -2\pi < \arg z < \pi.
\end{align}$$

These can be extended to other values of arg z using equations relating H^{(1)}_{α}(ze^{imπ}) and H^{(2)}_{α}(ze^{imπ}) to H^{(1)}_{α}(z) and H^{(2)}_{α}(z).

It is interesting that although the Bessel function of the first kind is the average of the two Hankel functions, J_{α}(z) is not asymptotic to the average of these two asymptotic forms when z is negative (because one or the other will not be correct there, depending on the arg z used). But the asymptotic forms for the Hankel functions permit us to write asymptotic forms for the Bessel functions of first and second kinds for complex (non-real) z so long as |z| goes to infinity at a constant phase angle arg z (using the square root having positive real part):
$$\begin{align}
J_\alpha(z) &\sim \frac{1}{\sqrt{2\pi z}} e^{i\left(z-\frac{\alpha\pi}{2}-\frac{\pi}{4}\right)} && \text{for } -\pi < \arg z < 0, \\[1ex]
J_\alpha(z) &\sim \frac{1}{\sqrt{2\pi z}} e^{-i\left(z-\frac{\alpha\pi}{2}-\frac{\pi}{4}\right)} && \text{for } 0 < \arg z < \pi, \\[1ex]
Y_\alpha(z) &\sim -i\frac{1}{\sqrt{2\pi z}} e^{i\left(z-\frac{\alpha\pi}{2}-\frac{\pi}{4}\right)} && \text{for } -\pi < \arg z < 0, \\[1ex]
Y_\alpha(z) &\sim i\frac{1}{\sqrt{2\pi z}} e^{-i\left(z-\frac{\alpha\pi}{2}-\frac{\pi}{4}\right)} && \text{for } 0 < \arg z < \pi.
\end{align}$$

For the modified Bessel functions, Hankel developed asymptotic expansions as well:
$$\begin{align}
I_\alpha(z) &\sim \frac{e^z}{\sqrt{2\pi z}} \left(1 - \frac{4 \alpha^2 - 1}{8z} + \frac{\left(4 \alpha^2 - 1\right) \left(4 \alpha^2 - 9\right)}{2! (8z)^2} - \frac{\left(4 \alpha^2 - 1\right) \left(4 \alpha^2 - 9\right) \left(4 \alpha^2 - 25\right)}{3! (8z)^3} + \cdots \right) &&\text{for }\left|\arg z\right|<\frac{\pi}{2}, \\
K_\alpha(z) &\sim \sqrt{\frac{\pi}{2z}} e^{-z} \left(1 + \frac{4 \alpha^2 - 1}{8z} + \frac{\left(4 \alpha^2 - 1\right) \left(4 \alpha^2 - 9\right)}{2! (8z)^2} + \frac{\left(4 \alpha^2 - 1\right) \left(4 \alpha^2 - 9\right) \left(4 \alpha^2 - 25\right)}{3! (8z)^3} + \cdots \right) &&\text{for }\left|\arg z\right|<\frac{3\pi}{2}.
\end{align}$$

There is also the asymptotic form (for large real $z$)
$$\begin{align}
I_\alpha(z) = \frac{1}{\sqrt{2\pi z}\sqrt[4]{1+\frac{\alpha^2}{z^2}}}\exp\left(-\alpha \operatorname{arcsinh}\left(\frac{\alpha}{z}\right) + z\sqrt{1+\frac{\alpha^2}{z^2}}\right)\left(1 + \mathcal{O}\left(\frac{1}{z \sqrt{1+\frac{\alpha^2}{z^2}}}\right)\right).
\end{align}$$

When α = 1/2, all the terms except the first vanish, and we have
$$\begin{align}
I_{{1}/{2}}(z) &= \sqrt{\frac{2}{\pi}} \frac{\sinh(z)}{\sqrt{z}} \sim \frac{e^z}{\sqrt{2\pi z}} && \text{for }\left|\arg z\right| < \tfrac{\pi}{2}, \\[1ex]
K_{{1}/{2}}(z) &= \sqrt{\frac{\pi}{2}} \frac{e^{-z}}{\sqrt{z}}.
\end{align}$$

For small arguments $0<|z|\ll\sqrt{\alpha + 1}$, we have
$$\begin{align}
I_\alpha(z) &\sim \frac{1}{\Gamma(\alpha+1)} \left( \frac{z}{2} \right)^\alpha, \\[1ex]
K_\alpha(z) &\sim \begin{cases}
-\ln \left (\dfrac{z}{2} \right ) - \gamma & \text{if } \alpha=0 \\[1ex]
\frac{\Gamma(\alpha)}{2} \left( \dfrac{2}{z} \right)^\alpha & \text{if } \alpha > 0
\end{cases}
\end{align}$$

== Properties ==
For any Bessel function whose order $\alpha$ is not a negative integer, the derivatives of the function can be computed as:

${d \over dx}J_\alpha(x) = J_{\alpha-1}(x)-{\alpha \over x}J_\alpha(x)$

or, equivalently,

${d \over dx}J_\alpha(x) = {\alpha \over x}J_\alpha(x)-J_{\alpha + 1}(x)$

These formulas can be used to determine a recurrence relation for $J_\alpha(x)$, a more general form of which is given below.

For integer order α = n, J_{n} is often defined via a Laurent series for a generating function:
$$e^{\frac{x}{2}\left(t-\frac{1}{t}\right)} = \sum_{n=-\infty}^\infty J_n(x) t^n$$
an approach used by P. A. Hansen in 1843. (This can be generalized to non-integer order by contour integration or other methods.)

Infinite series of Bessel functions in the form $\sum_{\nu=-\infty}^\infty J_{N\nu + p}(x)$ where $\nu, p \in \mathbb{Z}, \ N \in \mathbb{Z}^+$ arise in many physical systems and are defined in closed form by the Sung series. For example, when N = 3: $\sum_{\nu=-\infty}^\infty J_{3\nu+p}(x) = \frac{1}{3}\left[1+2\cos{(x\sqrt{3}/2-2\pi p/3)}\right]$. More generally, the Sung series and the alternating Sung series are written as:
$$\sum_{\nu=-\infty}^\infty J_{N\nu+p}(x) = \frac{1}{N}\sum_{q=0}^{N-1} e^{ix\sin{2\pi q/N}}e^{-i2\pi pq/N}$$
$$\sum_{\nu=-\infty}^\infty (-1)^\nu J_{N\nu+p}(x) = \frac{1}{N} \sum_{q=0}^{N-1}e^{ix\sin{(2q+1)\pi/N}}e^{-i(2q+1)\pi p/N}$$

A series expansion using Bessel functions (Kapteyn series) is
$$\frac {1}{1-z} = 1 + 2 \sum _{n=1}^{\infty } J_{n}(nz).$$

Another important relation for integer orders is the Jacobi–Anger expansion:
$$e^{iz \cos \phi} = \sum_{n=-\infty}^\infty i^n J_n(z) e^{in\phi}$$
and

$$e^{i z \sin \theta} \equiv \sum_{n=-\infty}^{\infty}       J_n(z)\, e^{i n \theta}.$$

The latter is equivalent to
$$e^{\pm iz \sin \phi} = J_0(z)+2\sum_{n=1}^\infty J_{2n}(z) \cos(2n\phi) \pm 2i \sum_{n=0}^\infty J_{2n+1}(z)\sin((2n+1)\phi)$$
which is used to expand a plane wave as a sum of cylindrical waves, or to find the Fourier series of a tone-modulated FM signal.

More generally, a series
$$f(z)=a_0^\nu J_\nu (z)+ 2 \cdot \sum_{k=1}^\infty a_k^\nu J_{\nu+k}(z)$$
is called Neumann expansion of f. The coefficients for ν = 0 have the explicit form
$$a_k^0=\frac{1}{2 \pi i} \int_{|z|=c} f(z) O_k(z) \,dz$$
where O_{k} is Neumann's polynomial.

Selected functions admit the special representation
$$f(z)=\sum_{k=0}^\infty a_k^\nu J_{\nu+2k}(z)$$
with
$$a_k^\nu=2(\nu+2k) \int_0^\infty f(z) \frac{J_{\nu+2k}(z)}z \,dz$$
due to the orthogonality relation
$$\int_0^\infty J_\alpha(z) J_\beta(z) \frac {dz} z= \frac 2 \pi \frac{\sin\left(\frac \pi 2 (\alpha-\beta) \right)}{\alpha^2 -\beta^2}$$

More generally, if f has a branch-point near the origin of such a nature that
$$f(z)= \sum_{k=0} a_k J_{\nu+k}(z)$$
then
$$\mathcal{L}\left\{\sum_{k=0} a_k J_{\nu+k}\right\}(s)=\frac{1}{\sqrt{1+s^2}}\sum_{k=0}\frac{a_k}{\left(s+\sqrt{1+s^2} \right) ^{\nu+k}}$$
or
$$\sum_{k=0} a_k \xi^{\nu+k}= \frac{1+\xi^2}{2\xi} \mathcal{L}\{f \} \left( \frac{1-\xi^2}{2\xi} \right)$$
where $\mathcal{L}\{f \}$ is the Laplace transform of f.

Another way to define the Bessel functions is the Poisson representation formula and the Mehler-Sonine formula:
$$\begin{align}
J_\nu(z) &= \frac{\left(\frac{z}{2}\right)^\nu}{\Gamma\left(\nu +\frac{1}{2}\right)\sqrt{\pi}} \int_{-1}^1 e^{izs}\left(1-s^2\right)^{\nu-\frac{1}{2}} \,ds \\[5px]
&=\frac 2{{\left(\frac{z}{2}\right)}^\nu\cdot \sqrt{\pi} \cdot \Gamma\left(\frac{1}{2}-\nu\right)} \int_1^\infty \frac{\sin zu}{\left(u^2-1 \right )^{\nu+\frac 1 2}} \,du
\end{align}$$
where ν > −1/2 and z ∈ C. This formula is useful especially when working with Fourier transforms.

Because Bessel's equation becomes Hermitian (self-adjoint) if it is divided by x, the solutions must satisfy an orthogonality relationship for appropriate boundary conditions. In particular, it follows that:
$$\int_0^1 x J_\alpha\left(x u_{\alpha,m}\right) J_\alpha\left(x u_{\alpha,n}\right) \,dx = \frac{\delta_{m,n}}{2} \left[J_{\alpha+1} \left(u_{\alpha,m}\right)\right]^2 = \frac{\delta_{m,n}}{2} \left[J_{\alpha}'\left(u_{\alpha,m}\right)\right]^2$$
where α > −1, δ_{m,n} is the Kronecker delta, and u_{α,m} is the mth zero of J_{α}(x). This orthogonality relation can then be used to extract the coefficients in the Fourier–Bessel series, where a function is expanded in the basis of the functions J_{α}(x u_{α,m}) for fixed α and varying m.

An analogous relationship for the spherical Bessel functions follows immediately:
$$\int_0^1 x^2 j_\alpha\left(x u_{\alpha,m}\right) j_\alpha\left(x u_{\alpha,n}\right) \,dx = \frac{\delta_{m,n}}{2} \left[j_{\alpha+1}\left(u_{\alpha,m}\right)\right]^2$$

If one defines a boxcar function of x that depends on a small parameter ε as:
$$f_\varepsilon(x)=\frac 1\varepsilon \operatorname{rect}\left(\frac{x-1}\varepsilon\right)$$
(where rect is the rectangle function) then the Hankel transform of it (of any given order α > −1/2), g_{ε}(k), approaches J_{α}(k) as ε approaches zero, for any given k. Conversely, the Hankel transform (of the same order) of g_{ε}(k) is f_{ε}(x):
$$\int_0^\infty k J_\alpha(kx) g_\varepsilon(k) \,dk = f_\varepsilon(x)$$
which is zero everywhere except near 1. As ε approaches zero, the right-hand side approaches δ(x − 1), where δ is the Dirac delta function. This admits the limit (in the distributional sense):
$$\int_0^\infty k J_\alpha(kx) J_\alpha(k) \,dk = \delta(x-1)$$

A change of variables then yields the closure equation:
$$\int_0^\infty x J_\alpha(ux) J_\alpha(vx) \,dx = \frac{1}{u} \delta(u - v)$$
for α > −1/2. For the spherical Bessel functions the orthogonality relation is:
$$\int_0^\infty x^2 j_\alpha(ux) j_\alpha(vx) \,dx = \frac{\pi}{2uv} \delta(u - v)$$
for α > −1.

Another important property of Bessel's equations, which follows from Abel's identity, involves the Wronskian of the solutions:
$$A_\alpha(x) \frac{dB_\alpha}{dx} - \frac{dA_\alpha}{dx} B_\alpha(x) = \frac{C_\alpha}{x}$$
where A_{α} and B_{α} are any two solutions of Bessel's equation, and C_{α} is a constant independent of x (which depends on α and on the particular Bessel functions considered). In particular,
$$J_\alpha(x) \frac{dY_\alpha}{dx} - \frac{dJ_\alpha}{dx} Y_\alpha(x) = \frac{2}{\pi x}$$
and
$$I_\alpha(x) \frac{dK_\alpha}{dx} - \frac{dI_\alpha}{dx} K_\alpha(x) = -\frac{1}{x},$$
for α > −1.

For α > −1, the even entire function of genus 1, x^{−α}J_{α}(x), has only real zeros. Let
$$0<j_{\alpha,1}<j_{\alpha,2}<\cdots<j_{\alpha,n}<\cdots$$
be all its positive zeros, then
$$J_{\alpha}(z)=\frac{\left(\frac{z}{2}\right)^\alpha}{\Gamma(\alpha+1)}\prod_{n=1}^{\infty}\left(1-\frac{z^2}{j_{\alpha,n}^2}\right)$$

(There are a large number of other known integrals and identities that are not reproduced here, but which can be found in the references.)

=== Recurrence relations ===
The functions J_{α}, Y_{α}, H^{(1)}_{α}, and H^{(2)}_{α} all satisfy the recurrence relations
$$\frac{2\alpha}{x} Z_\alpha(x) = Z_{\alpha-1}(x) + Z_{\alpha+1}(x)$$
and
$$2\frac{dZ_\alpha (x)}{dx} = Z_{\alpha-1}(x) - Z_{\alpha+1}(x),$$
where Z denotes J, Y, H^{(1)}, or H^{(2)}. These two identities are often combined, e.g. added or subtracted, to yield various other relations. In this way, for example, one can compute Bessel functions of higher orders (or higher derivatives) given the values at lower orders (or lower derivatives). In particular, it follows that
$$\begin{align}
\left( \frac{1}{x} \frac{d}{dx} \right)^m \left[ x^\alpha Z_\alpha (x) \right] &= x^{\alpha - m} Z_{\alpha - m} (x), \\
\left( \frac{1}{x} \frac{d}{dx} \right)^m \left[ \frac{Z_\alpha (x)}{x^\alpha} \right] &= (-1)^m \frac{Z_{\alpha + m} (x)}{x^{\alpha + m}}.
\end{align}$$

Using the previous relations one can arrive to similar relations for the Spherical Bessel functions:

$$\frac{2\alpha +1}{x}j_{\alpha}(x) = j_{\alpha - 1} + j_{\alpha +1}$$

and

$$\frac{dj_{\alpha}(x)}{dx} = j_{\alpha-1} - \frac{\alpha+1}{x}j_\alpha$$

Modified Bessel functions follow similar relations:
$$e^{\left(\frac{x}{2}\right)\left(t+\frac{1}{t}\right)} = \sum_{n=-\infty}^\infty I_n(x) t^n$$
and
$$e^{z \cos \theta} = I_0(z) + 2\sum_{n=1}^\infty I_n(z) \cos n\theta$$
and
$$\frac{1}{2\pi} \int_0^{2\pi} e^{z \cos (m\theta) + y \cos \theta} d\theta = I_0(z)I_0(y) + 2\sum_{n=1}^\infty I_n(z)I_{mn}(y).$$

The recurrence relation reads
$$\begin{align}
C_{\alpha-1}(x) - C_{\alpha+1}(x) &= \frac{2\alpha}{x} C_\alpha(x), \\[1ex]
C_{\alpha-1}(x) + C_{\alpha+1}(x) &= 2\frac{d}{dx}C_\alpha(x),
\end{align}$$
where C_{α} denotes I_{α} or e^{αiπ}K_{α}. These recurrence relations are useful for discrete diffusion problems.

=== Transcendence ===
In 1929, Carl Ludwig Siegel proved that J_{ν}(x), J'_{ν}(x), and the logarithmic derivative J'_{ν}(x)/J_{ν}(x) are transcendental numbers when ν is rational and x is algebraic and nonzero. The same proof also implies that $\Gamma(v+1)(2/x)^v J_{v}(x)$ is transcendental under the same assumptions.

=== Addition theorems ===
Neumann's addition theorem, applied to Bessel functions of the first kind, states that when $n \in \mathbb{N}$ or $|y| < |x|$,
$$\sum_{\nu=-\infty}^\infty J_{n - \nu}(x) J_\nu(y) = J_{n}(x + y),$$
$$\sum_{\nu=-\infty}^\infty J_{n + \nu}(x) J_\nu(y) = J_{n}(x - y).$$

A generalization is Graf's addition theorem, which for Bessel functions of the first kind, states that for all $x, y, \phi \in \mathbb{C}$ such that $\left|y{\rm e}^{\pm{\rm i}\phi}\right| < |x|$,
$$\sum_{\nu=-\infty}^\infty J_{n+\nu}(x) J_\nu(y){\rm e}^{{\rm i}\nu\phi} = J_n\left(\sqrt{x^2+y^2-2xy\cos\phi}\right) \left(\frac{x-y{\rm e}^{-{\rm i}\phi}}{x-y{\rm e}^{+{\rm i}\phi}}\right)^{\frac{n}{2}},$$
where we take the branch of the square root that equals $x$ when $y = 0$.

=== Sums with Bessel functions ===
From Neumann's addition theorem it follows that
$$\sum_{\nu=-\infty}^\infty J_\nu(x) J_{\nu + n}(x) = \delta_{n, 0}$$
and as a consequence
$$\sum_{\nu=-\infty}^\infty J_{\nu}^2(x) = 1.$$

These sums can be extended to include a term multiplier that is a polynomial function of the index. For example,
$$\sum_{\nu=-\infty}^\infty \nu J_\nu(x) J_{\nu + n}(x) = \frac{x}{2} \left( \delta_{n, 1} + \delta_{n, -1} \right),$$
$$\sum_{\nu=-\infty}^\infty \nu J_{\nu}^2(x) = 0,$$
$$\sum_{\nu=-\infty}^\infty \nu^2 J_\nu(x) J_{\nu + n}(x) = \frac{x}{2} \left( \delta_{n, -1} - \delta_{n, 1} \right) + \frac{x^2}{4} \left( \delta_{n, -2} + 2 \delta_{n, 0} + \delta_{n, 2} \right),$$
$$\sum_{\nu=-\infty}^\infty \nu^2 J_{\nu}^2(x) = \frac{x^2}{2}.$$

For term multipliers that are reciprocals of linear functions, see the Lerche–Newberger sum rule; in fact, Newberger showed all rational functions of the form $\tfrac{\nu^k}{\nu+\mu}$ yield closed-form expressions in terms of Bessel functions.

== Multiplication theorem ==
The Bessel functions obey a multiplication theorem
$$\lambda^{-\nu} J_\nu(\lambda z) = \sum_{n=0}^\infty \frac{1}{n!} \left(\frac{\left(1 - \lambda^2\right)z}{2}\right)^n J_{\nu+n}(z),$$
where λ and ν may be taken as arbitrary complex numbers. For |λ^{2} − 1| < 1, the above expression also holds if J is replaced by Y. The analogous identities for modified Bessel functions and |λ^{2} − 1| < 1 are
$$\lambda^{-\nu} I_\nu(\lambda z) = \sum_{n=0}^\infty \frac{1}{n!} \left(\frac{\left(\lambda^2 - 1\right)z}{2}\right)^n I_{\nu+n}(z)$$
and
$$\lambda^{-\nu} K_\nu(\lambda z) = \sum_{n=0}^\infty \frac{(-1)^n}{n!} \left(\frac{\left(\lambda^2 - 1\right)z}{2}\right)^n K_{\nu+n}(z).$$

== Zeros of the Bessel function ==
=== Bourget's hypothesis ===
Bessel himself originally proved that for nonnegative integers n, the equation J_{n}(x) = 0 has an infinite number of solutions in x. When the functions J_{n}(x) are plotted on the same graph, though, none of the zeros seem to coincide for different values of n except for the zero at x = 0. This phenomenon is known as Bourget's hypothesis after the 19th-century French mathematician who studied Bessel functions. Specifically it states that for any integers n ≥ 0 and m ≥ 1, the functions J_{n}(x) and J_{n + m}(x) have no common zeros other than the one at x = 0. The hypothesis was proved by Carl Ludwig Siegel in 1929.

=== Transcendence ===
Siegel proved in 1929 that when ν is rational, all nonzero roots of J_{ν}(x) and J'_{ν}(x) are transcendental, as are all the roots of K_{ν}(x). It is also known that all roots of the higher derivatives $J_\nu^{(n)}(x)$ for n ≤ 18 are transcendental, except for the special values $J_1^{(3)}(\pm\sqrt3) = 0$ and $J_0^{(4)}(\pm\sqrt3) = 0$.

=== Numerical approaches ===
For numerical studies about the zeros of the Bessel function, see Gil, Segura & Temme (2007), Kravanja et al. (1998) and Moler (2004).

=== Numerical values ===
The first zeros in J_{0} (i.e., j_{0,1}, j_{0,2} and j_{0,3}) occur at arguments of approximately 2.40483, 5.52008 and 8.65373, respectively.

== History ==
=== Waves and elasticity problems ===
The first appearance of a Bessel function appears in the work of Daniel Bernoulli in 1732, while working on the analysis of a vibrating string, a problem that was tackled before by his father Johann Bernoulli. Daniel considered a flexible chain suspended from a fixed point above and free at its lower end. The solution of the differential equation led to the introduction of a function that is now considered $J_0(x)$. Bernoulli also developed a method to find the zeros of the function.

Leonhard Euler in 1736, found a link between other functions (now known as Laguerre polynomials) and Bernoulli's solution. Euler also introduced a non-uniform chain that led to the introduction of functions now related to modified Bessel functions $I_n(x)$.

In the middle of the eighteen century, Jean le Rond d'Alembert had found a formula to solve the wave equation. By 1771 there was dispute between Bernoulli, Euler, d'Alembert and Joseph-Louis Lagrange on the nature of the solutions of vibrating strings.

Euler worked in 1778 on buckling, introducing the concept of Euler's critical load. To solve the problem he introduced the series for $J_{\pm 1/3}(x)$. Euler also worked out the solutions of vibrating 2D membranes in cylindrical coordinates in 1780. In order to solve his differential equation he introduced a power series associated to $J_n(x)$, for integer n.

During the end of the 18th century Lagrange, Pierre-Simon Laplace and Marc-Antoine Parseval also found equivalents to the Bessel functions. In particular, Parseval found an integral representation of $J_0(x)$ using cosine.

At the beginning of the 1800s, Joseph Fourier used $J_0(x)$ to solve the heat equation in a problem with cylindrical symmetry. Fourier won a prize of the French Academy of Sciences for this work in 1811. But most of the details of his work, including the use of a Fourier series, remained unpublished until 1822. Poisson, in rivalry with Fourier, extended Fourier's work in 1823, introducing new properties of Bessel functions, including Bessel functions of half-integer order (now known as spherical Bessel functions).

=== Astronomical problems ===
In 1770, Lagrange introduced the series expansion of Bessel functions to solve Kepler's equation, a transcendental equation in astronomy. Friedrich Wilhelm Bessel had seen Lagrange's solution but found it difficult to handle. In 1813 in a letter to Carl Friedrich Gauss, Bessel simplified the calculation using trigonometric functions. Bessel published his work in 1819, independently introducing the method of Fourier series unaware of the work of Fourier which was published later. In 1824, Bessel carried out a systematic investigation of the functions, which earned the functions his name. In older literature the functions were called cylindrical functions or even Bessel–Fourier functions.

== See also ==
- Anger function
- Bessel polynomials
- Bessel–Clifford function
- Bessel–Maitland function
- Fourier–Bessel series
- Hahn–Exton q-Bessel function
- Hankel transform
- Incomplete Bessel functions
- Jackson q-Bessel function
- Kelvin functions
- Kontorovich–Lebedev transform
- Lentz's algorithm
- Lerche–Newberger sum rule
- Lommel function
- Lommel polynomial
- Neumann polynomial
- Schlömilch's series
- Sonine formula
- Struve function
- Vibrations of a circular membrane
- Weber function (defined at Anger function)
- Gauss' circle problem
