= Mehler =

Mehler is a German surname that may refer to:

- Barry Mehler (born 1947), Jewish-American professor of humanities at Ferris State University
- Gustav Ferdinand Mehler (1835–1895), German mathematician
- Jacques Mehler, cognitive psychologist specializing in language acquisition
- Jay Mehler (born 1971), musician from Philadelphia, United States
- Johann Baptist Mehler (died 1930), German Catholic priest, prelate, and religious writer
- John Mehler (born 1948), Californian drummer for Love Song, Spirit of Creation, Noah and other bands
- Kenny Mehler (born 1987), American musician and singer-songwriter
- Tobias Mehler (born 1976), Canadian actor who has appeared in film and television productions

== See also ==
- Mehler function or conical functions, introduced by Gustav Ferdinand Mehler in 1868
- Mehler kernel, the propagator of the Hamiltonian for the quantum harmonic oscillator
- Mehler reaction, also known as Photorespiration, a process in plant metabolism
- Fock-Mehler transform, an integral transform introduced by Mehler (1881) and rediscovered by Fock (1943)
- Heine-Mehler formula describes the asymptotic behavior of the Legendre polynomials as the index tends to infinity
- Meher (disambiguation)
- Mehl
- Mehle
- Methler
