= Wizner =

Wizner is a surname. Notable people with the surname include:

- Ben Wizner (born 1971), American lawyer, writer, and civil liberties advocate
- Stephen Wizner, American legal scholar

== See also ==
- Weisner
- Winer
