= Lommel (disambiguation) =

Lommel is a municipality in Belgium.

Lommel may also refer to:

- Eugen von Lommel (1837–1899), German physicist
  - Lommel function, a physics function introduced by Eugen von Lommel
  - Lommel polynomial, a polynomial introduced by Eugen von Lommel
- Léon Lommel (1893–1978), Luxembourgian prelate of the Roman Catholic Church
- Pim van Lommel (born 1943), Dutch cardiologist and scientist
- Ulli Lommel (1944–2017), German actor and director
- K.F.C. Lommel S.K., Belgian association football club (1932–2003)
- Lommel S.K., Belgian association football club (with 2003)
