= Weisner =

Weisner may refer to:

- Weisner's method, a mathematical method for finding generating functions for special functions using representation theory of Lie
- Magic Weisner (foaled 1999), an American Thoroughbred racehorse

People

- Jamie Weisner (born 1994), American–Canadian basketball player
- Louis Weisner (1899–1988), an American-Canadian mathematician at the University of New Brunswick who introduced Weisner's method
- Maurice F. Weisner (1917-2006), a United States Navy four-star admiral
- Melanie Weisner (born 1986), an American professional poker player
- Pat Weisner (born 1982), an Australian rugby league player
- Tom Weisner (born c. 1949), an American politician

== See also ==
- Wizner, an Americanized version
