= List of things named after Eduard Heine =

Eduard Heine (16 March 1821, Berlin – October 1881, Halle) was a German mathematician in Prussia. His name is given to several mathematical concepts that he was instrumental in developing:

- Andréief–Heine identity
- Heine–Borel theorem
- Heine–Cantor theorem
- Heine–Stieltjes polynomials
- Heine definition of continuity
- Heine functions
- Heine's identity
- Mehler–Heine formula
