= Burchnall =

Burchnall is a surname. Notable people with the surname include:

- Ian Burchnall (born 1983), English football manager
- Joseph Langley Burchnall (1892–1975), English mathematician
- Richard Burchnall (born 1948), English cricketer and educator
