= Lommel function =

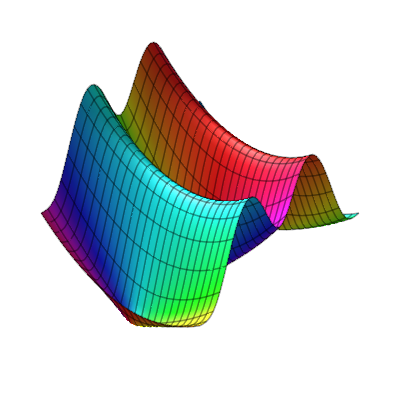

In mathematics, the Lommel differential equation, named after Eugen von Lommel, is an inhomogeneous form of the Bessel differential equation

$$z^2 \frac{d^2y}{dz^2} + z \frac{dy}{dz} + (z^2 - \nu^2)y =  z^{\mu+1}.$$

Its solutions are given by the Lommel functions $s_{\mu,\nu}(z)$ and $S_{\mu,\nu}(z)$:

$$s_{\mu,\nu}(z) = \frac{\pi}{2} \left(Y_{\nu} (z) \! \int_{0}^{z} \!\! x^{\mu} J_{\nu}(x) \, dx - J_\nu (z) \! \int_{0}^{z} \!\! x^{\mu} Y_{\nu}(x) \, dx \right),$$
$$S_{\mu,\nu}(z) = s_{\mu,\nu}(z) + 2^{\mu-1} \Gamma\left(\frac{\mu + \nu + 1}{2}\right) \Gamma\left(\frac{\mu - \nu + 1}{2}\right)
\left(\sin \left[(\mu - \nu)\frac{\pi}{2}\right] J_\nu(z) - \cos \left[(\mu - \nu)\frac{\pi}{2}\right] Y_\nu(z)\right),$$

where $J_\nu(z)$ is a Bessel function of the first kind and $Y_\nu(z)$ a Bessel function of the second kind.

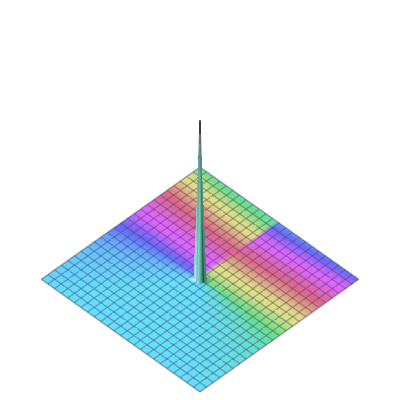

The function $s_{\mu,\nu}$ can also be written as

$$s_{\mu, \nu} (z) = \frac{z^{\mu + 1}}{(\mu - \nu + 1)(\mu + \nu + 1)} {}_1F_2\bigg(1; \frac{\mu}{2} - \frac{\nu}{2} + \frac{3}{2} , \frac{\mu}{2} + \frac{\nu}{2} + \frac{3}{2} ;-\frac{z^2}{4}\bigg),$$

where ${}_1F_2$ is a generalized hypergeometric function.

== See also ==
- Anger function
- Lommel polynomial
- Struve function
- Weber function
