= J. Horn =

J. Horn may refer to:

- Jakob Horn, German mathematician
- J. Horn (Cambridgeshire cricketer), English cricketer
