= Georgii Malyuzhinets =

Russian physicist (1910–1969)

Georgii Danilovich Malyuzhinets
- Born: 2 July 1910; Moscow, Russian Empire
- Died: 14 August 1969 (aged 59); Moscow, Soviet Union
- Education: Moscow State University
- Known for: Sommerfeld—Malyuzhinets theory
- Scientific career
- Workplaces: Moscow Institute of Physics and Technology; Lebedev Physical Institute; Academy of Sciences of the Soviet Union
- Thesis: Certain generalizations of the reflection method in the theory of diffraction of sinusoidal waves (1950)
- Academic advisors: Vladimir Fock, Mikhail Leontovich, Nikolai Andreyev

Georgii Danilovich Malyuzhinets (Note: Alternatively transliterated as Maliuzhinets or Maliughinetz.) (Russian: Георгий Данилович Малюжинец; 2 July 1910 — 14 August 1969) was a Soviet physicist. He is best known for his contributions to the theory of scattering and diffraction in acoustics and electromagnetics.

Born on 2 July 1910 in Moscow, Malyuzhinets was educated at the Department of Physics at Moscow State University, receiving Candidate of Sciences degree in 1938. Serving as a professor at the same institution until 1942, he became a research fellow at Lebedev Physical Institute in 1944, and presented his Doctor of Science dissertation on sound-absorbing screens in 1951. During his academic career, he has studied under Vladimir Fock, Mikhail Leontovich and Nikolai Andreyev. Becoming a faculty member at the Department of Acoustics in Moscow Institute of Physics and Technology in 1954, he served as the head of Mathematical Laboratory of the Acoustics Institute of Academy of Sciences of the Soviet Union until his death in 1969.

Malyuzhinets' most notable contribution to the diffraction theory is the exact calculation of wave diffraction from a wedge with impedance boundary conditions with Sommerfeld integrals; it is widely adopted in diffraction problems in acoustics, electromagnetics and fluid dynamics. Developed as a part of his DSc. dissertation and referred colloquially as Malyuzhinets or Sommerfeld–Malyuzhinets theory, this solution is expressed in terms of special functions known as Malyuzhinets functions. Malyuzhinets' other contributions include theory of acoustic coatings and gratings, active noise control and parabolic equation methods for short-wave diffraction. He was one of the first researchers to adopt the finite difference method for parabolic diffraction problems, having developed an early finite difference code for underwater acoustics in 1964. His studies on Sommerfeld radiation condition in backward-wave transmission lines in 1951 anticipitated the theory and discovery of negative-index metamaterials in the 2000s.

== Selected publications ==
Books

- Malyuzhinets, G. D. (1980). Generalisation of the Reflection Method in the Theory of Diffraction (in Russian). Leningrad: Rumb.
- Malyuzhinets, G. D. (1981). The Sommerfeld Integrals and their Applications (in Russian). Leningrad: Rumb.

Journal articles

- Malyuzhinets, G. D. (1951). "A note on the radiation principle". Zhurnal Technicheskoi Fiziki. 21: 940–942.
- Malyuzhinets, G. D. (1958). "Inversion formulas for Sommerfeld integrals". Soviet Physics-Doklady. 3 (1): 52–56.
- Malyuzhinets, G. D. (1958). "Excitation, reflection and emission of surface waves from a wedge with given face impedances". Soviet Physics-Doklady. 3 (4): 752–755.
- Malyuzhinets, G. D. (1959). "Progress in understanding diffraction phenomena". Soviet Physics Uspekhi. 69 (2): 321–334.
- Malyuzhinets, G. D. (1959). "Developments in our concepts of diffraction phenomena (on the 130th anniversary of the death of Thomas Young)"". UFN. 69 (2): 321–334.
- Malyughinetz, G. D. (1960). "Das Sommerfeldsche Integral und die Lösung von Beugungsaufgaben in Winkelgebieten". Annalen der Physik. 461 (1–2): 107–112.
- Malyuzhinets, G. D.; Tuzhilin, A. A. (1962). "The electromagnetic field excited by an electric dipole in a wedge-shaped region". Soviet Physics-Doklady. 7 (10): 879–882.
