= List of things named after Vladimir Fock =

A list of things named after Soviet scientist, Vladimir Fock:

== Physics ==
- Fock matrix
  - Fock operator
- Fock model
- Fock representation
- Fock space
  - Bargmann–Fock space
- Fock state
- Fock symmetry
  - Fock–Lorentz symmetry
- Fock–Schwinger gauge
- Hartree–Fock method
  - Post–Hartree–Fock
  - Restricted open-shell Hartree–Fock
  - Unrestricted Hartree–Fock
- Klein–Gordon–Fock equation

== Mathematics ==
- Mehler–Fock transform

== Other ==
- 10728 Vladimirfock, minor planet
