= Weber function =

In mathematics, Weber function can refer to several different families of functions, mostly named after the physicist H. F. Weber or the mathematician H. M. Weber:

- Weber modular functions $f, f_1, f_2$ named after the mathematician H. M. Weber
- Weber functions E_{ν} are solutions of an inhomogeneous Bessel equation, and are linear combinations of Anger functions if ν is not an integer, or linear combinations of Struve functions if ν is an integer
- Weber–Hermite function is another name for parabolic cylinder functions, which are solutions of Weber's (differential) equation
- Bessel function § Weber functions
