= Kathleen Ollerenshaw =

English mathematician (1912-2014)

Dame Kathleen Ollerenshaw DBE
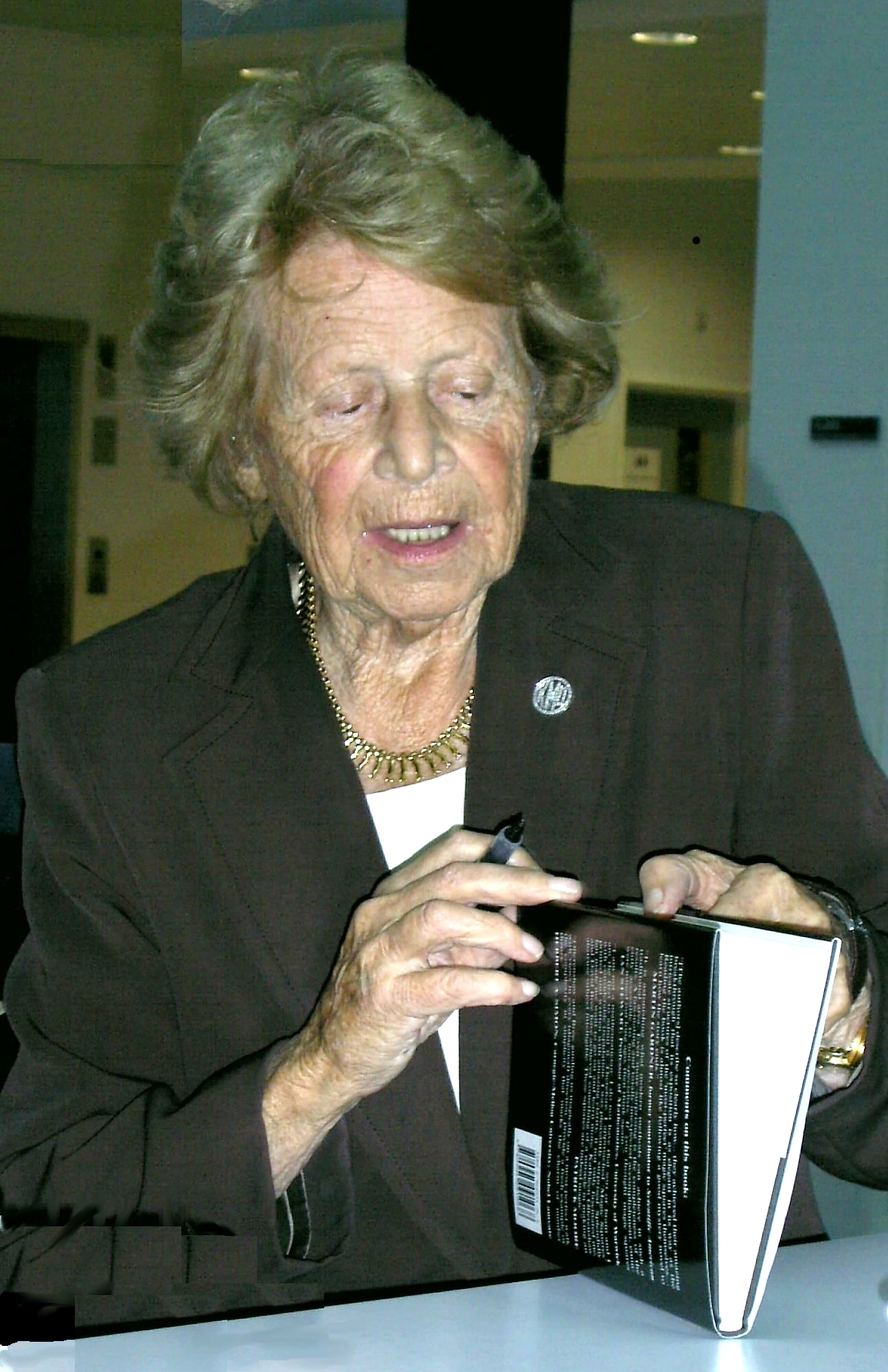
- Ollerenshaw signing a book in the Alan Turing Building
- Born: Kathleen Mary Timpson; 1 October 1912; Withington, Manchester, England
- Died: 10 August 2014 (aged 101); Didsbury, England
- Education: Somerville College, Oxford
- Spouse: Robert Ollerenshaw (m. 1939; died 1986)
- Children: 2
- Scientific career
- Fields: Magic square Lattices
- Workplaces: University of Manchester
- Thesis: (1945)
- Doctoral advisor: Theodore William Chaundy

Dame Kathleen Mary Ollerenshaw, DBE (née Timpson; 1 October 1912 – 10 August 2014) was a British mathematician and politician who was Lord Mayor of Manchester from 1975 to 1976 and an advisor on educational matters to Margaret Thatcher's government in the 1980s.

== Early life and education ==
She was born Kathleen Mary Timpson in Withington, Manchester, where she attended Lady Barn House School (1918–26). She was a grandchild of the founder of the Timpson shoe repair business, who had moved to Manchester from Kettering and established the business there by 1870. She became fascinated with mathematics, inspired by the Lady Barn headmistress, Miss Jenkin Jones. While at Lady Barn, she met her future husband, Robert Ollerenshaw.

Ollerenshaw became completely deaf at age eight and was taught to lip read. She gravitated toward the study of mathematics as it is not dependent on hearing. She was further inspired by a headmistress at Lady Barn House School who studied mathematics at Cambridge.

As a young woman, she attended St Leonards School and Sixth Form College in St Andrews, Scotland where today the house of young male boarders is named after her. At the age of 19 she gained admittance to Somerville College, Oxford, to study mathematics. She completed her doctorate at Somerville in 1945 on "Critical Lattices" under the supervision of Theo Chaundy. She wrote five original research papers which were sufficient for her to earn her DPhil degree without the need of a formal written thesis.

While an undergraduate, she became engaged to Robert Ollerenshaw, who became a distinguished military surgeon (Colonel R.G.W. Ollerenshaw, ERD, TD, BM, DMRD) and a pioneer of medical illustration. They married in September 1939 and had two children, Charles (1941–99) and Florence (1946–72). In 1942 she suffered a miscarriage and "cried nonstop for three days" as a result of stress when her husband was posted abroad for front-line war service.

== Career ==
After the Second World War, the Ollerenshaws moved to Manchester, where Kathleen worked as a part-time lecturer in the mathematics department at Manchester University while raising her children and continued her work on lattices. In 1949, at the age of 37, she received her first effective hearing aid.

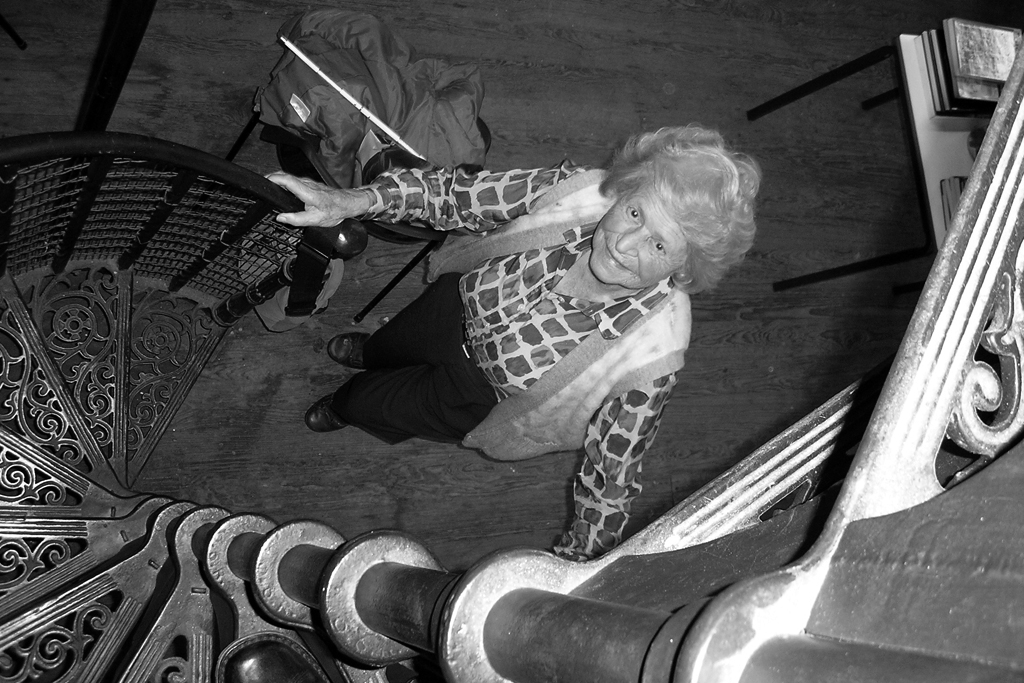
Kathleen Ollerenshaw, aged 95, at Manchester Astronomical Society in 2007

Outside of academia, Ollerenshaw served as a Conservative councillor for Rusholme for twenty-five years (1954–1979), a member of the city council's finance committee (1968–1971), a chairman of the education committee of the Association of Municipal Corporations (1967–1971), Lord Mayor of Manchester (1975–1976), High Sheriff of Greater Manchester from 1978 to 1979, and the prime motivator in the creation of the Royal Northern College of Music. She was made a Freeman of the City of Manchester and was an advisor on educational matters to Margaret Thatcher's government in the 1980s.

She was President of the Institute of Mathematics and its Applications from 1978 to 1979. She published at least 26 mathematical papers, her best-known contribution being to most-perfect pandiagonal magic squares. Upon her death, she left a legacy in trust to support distinguished research visitors and public engagement activities at the School of Mathematics, University of Manchester. An annual public lecture at the university is named in her honour.

An amateur astronomer, Ollerenshaw donated her telescope to Lancaster University, and an observatory there bears her name. She was an honorary member of the Manchester Astronomical Society and held the post of vice-president for a number of years.

Ollerenshaw attended St Leonards School in St Andrews, Fife, and served as the school's president from 1981 to 2003. She was succeeded by Baroness Byford, Conservative spokeswoman in the House of Lords. She turned 100 in October 2012.

She died in Didsbury on 10 August 2014, at the age of 101. Her husband and both their children had predeceased her.

== Honours and legacy ==
- In 1970, Ollerenshaw was appointed Dame Commander of the Order of the British Empire for services to education.
- Composer Sir Peter Maxwell Davies dedicated his Naxos Quartet No. 9 to her.

== Bibliography ==
- Dame Kathleen Ollerenshaw, To Talk of Many Things: an autobiography, Manchester Univ Press, 2004, ISBN 0-7190-6987-4
- Kathleen Ollerenshaw, David S. Brée: Most-perfect Pandiagonal Magic Squares: their construction and enumeration, Southend-on-Sea: Institute of Mathematics and its Applications, 1998, 186 pages, ISBN 0-905091-06-X
- Kathleen Ollerenshaw, Herman Bondi, Magic Squares of Order Four, Scholium Intl, 1983, ISBN 0-85403-201-0
- Kathleen Ollerenshaw, First Citizen, Hart-Davis, MacGibbon, 1977, ISBN 0-246-10976-9
- K. M. Ollerenshaw; D. S. Brée, "Most-perfect pandiagonal magic squares", in: Mathematics Today, 1998, vol. 34, pp. 139–143. ISSN 1361-2042.
- D. S. Brée and K. M. Ollerenshaw, "Pandiagonal magic-squares from mixed auxiliary squares", in: Mathematics Today, 1998, vol. 34, pp. 105–118. ISSN 1361-2042.
- Kathleen Ollerenshaw. 1944 The Critical Lattices of a Square Frame. Journal of the London Mathematical Society 19:75 part 3, pp. 178–184, The Critical Lattices of a Square Frame

Professional and academic associations
Preceded by Dr Wallis Taylor	President of the Manchester Statistical Society; 1981–83	Succeeded by Richard Harrington
Honorary titles
Preceded by Frederick Balcombe	Lord Mayor of Manchester; 1975–1976	Succeeded by Kenneth Franklin
