= Wilfrid Norman Bailey =

British mathematician

Wilfrid N. Bailey
- Born: 5 September 1893; Durham
- Died: 23 October 1961 (aged 68)
- Citizenship: British
- Education: Victoria University of Manchester; London University; University of Cambridge
- Scientific career
- Fields: Hypergeometric series
- Thesis: (1931)
- Doctoral advisor: Louis Joel Mordell
- Doctoral students: Lucy Joan Slater

Wilfrid Norman Bailey (born 5 September 1893, Consett, Durham; died 23 October 1961, Eastbourne) was a mathematician who introduced Bailey's lemma and Bailey pairs into the theory of basic hypergeometric series. Bailey chains and Bailey transforms are named after him.
