= Mehle =

Mehle is a surname. Notable people with the surname include:

- Aileen Mehle (1918–2016), American journalist
- Eyvind Mehle (1895–1945), Norwegian radio personality, media professor and Nazi collaborator
- Roger W. Mehle (1915–1997), United States Navy admiral

== See also ==
- Mehler
