= Bailey pair =

Concept in mathematics

In mathematics, a Bailey pair is a pair of sequences satisfying certain relations, and a Bailey chain is a sequence of Bailey pairs. Bailey pairs were introduced by W. N. Bailey (1947, 1948) while studying the second proof Rogers 1917 of the Rogers–Ramanujan identities, and Bailey chains were introduced by Andrews (1984).

== Definition ==
The q-Pochhammer symbols $(a;q)_n$ are defined as:

$$(a;q)_n = \prod_{0\le j<n}(1-aq^j) = (1-a)(1-aq)\cdots(1-aq^{n-1}).$$

A pair of sequences (α_{n},β_{n}) is called a Bailey pair if they are related by

$$\beta_n=\sum_{r=0}^n\frac{\alpha_r}{(q;q)_{n-r}(aq;q)_{n+r}}$$

or equivalently

$$\alpha_n = (1-aq^{2n})\sum_{j=0}^n\frac{(aq;q)_{n+j-1}(-1)^{n-j}q^{n-j\choose 2}\beta_j}{(q;q)_{n-j}}.$$

== Bailey's lemma ==
Bailey's lemma states that if (α_{n},β_{n}) is a Bailey pair, then so is (α'_{n},β'_{n}) where

$$\alpha^\prime_n= \frac{(\rho_1;q)_n(\rho_2;q)_n(aq/\rho_1\rho_2)^n\alpha_n}{(aq/\rho_1;q)_n(aq/\rho_2;q)_n}$$
$$\beta^\prime_n = \sum_{j\ge0}\frac{(\rho_1;q)_j(\rho_2;q)_j(aq/\rho_1\rho_2;q)_{n-j}(aq/\rho_1\rho_2)^j\beta_j}{(q;q)_{n-j}(aq/\rho_1;q)_n(aq/\rho_2;q)_n}.$$

In other words, given one Bailey pair, one can construct a second using the formulas above. This process can be iterated to produce an infinite sequence of Bailey pairs, called a Bailey chain.

== Examples ==
An example of a Bailey pair is given by (Andrews, Askey & Roy 1999, p. 590)

$$\alpha_n = q^{n^2+n}\sum_{j=-n}^n(-1)^jq^{-j^2}, \quad \beta_n = \frac{(-q)^n}{(q^2;q^2)_n}.$$

L. J. Slater (1952) gave a list of 130 examples related to Bailey pairs.
