= Heine theorem =

Mathematical theorem relating to limits

Heine's theorem, named after the German mathematician Eduard Heine, establishes a link in mathematical analysis between limits of functions and limits of sequences. The theorem states that the existence and value of the limit of a function at a point can be characterized by the limits of all sequences that converge to that point. Conversely, information about sequential limits can be used to determine function limits. As a consequence, many properties of limits of functions may be derived from the corresponding properties of limits of sequences.

Specifically, it contains a statement with two parts:

Forward statement: Let $f$ be a function and let $a$ be an accumulation point of its domain. If
$$\lim\limits_{x\to a}f\left(x\right)=L,$$
then for every sequence $\left\{x_n\right\}$ that converges to $a$ and satisfies $x_n\ne a$ for all $n$, the sequence $\left\{f\left(x_n\right)\right\}$ converges to $L$; that is,
$$\lim\limits_{x\to a}f\left(x\right)=L\implies\forall\left\{x_n\right\}\left(\left(x_n\to a\land x_n\ne a\right)\implies f\left(x_n\right)\to L\right).$$

Converse statement: Conversely, if for every sequence $\left\{x_n\right\}$ with $x_n \to a$ and $x_n \neq a$ for all $n$, the sequence $\left\{f(x_n)\right\}$ converges to the same limit $L$, then the limit of $f$ at $a$ exists and equals $L$; in symbols,
$$\forall\left\{x_n\right\}\left(\left(x_n\to a\land x_n\ne a\right)\implies f\left(x_n\right)\to L\right)\implies\lim\limits_{x\to a}f\left(x\right)=L.$$

== Background ==
In several contexts, the topology of a space is conveniently specified in terms of limit points. This is often accomplished by specifying when a point is the limit of a sequence. Still, for some spaces that are too large in some sense, one specifies also when a point is the limit of more general sets of points indexed by a directed set, known as nets. A function is (Heine-)continuous only if it takes limits of sequences to limits of sequences. In the former case, preservation of limits is also sufficient; in the latter, a function may preserve all limits of sequences yet still fail to be continuous, and preservation of nets is a necessary and sufficient condition.

In detail, a function $f:X\to Y$ is sequentially continuous if whenever a sequence $\left\{x_n\right\}$ in $X$ converges to a limit $x,$ the sequence $\left\{f\left(x_n\right)\right\}$ converges to $f\left(x\right).$ Thus, sequentially continuous functions "preserve sequential limits." Every continuous function is sequentially continuous. If $X$ is a first-countable space and countable choice holds, then the converse also holds: any function preserving sequential limits is continuous. In particular, if $X$ is a metric space, sequential continuity and continuity are equivalent. For non-first-countable spaces, sequential continuity might be strictly weaker than continuity. (The spaces for which the two properties are equivalent are called sequential spaces.) This motivates the consideration of nets instead of sequences in general topological spaces. Continuous functions preserve the limits of nets, and this property characterizes continuous functions.

== Formal statement ==
Consider the case of real-valued functions of one real variable:

Theorem—A function $f : A \subseteq \R \to \R$ is continuous at $x_0$ if and only if it is sequentially continuous at that point.

Proof

(Sufficiency) Assume that $f:A\subseteq\mathbb{R}\to\mathbb{R}$ is continuous at $x_0$ (in the sense of $\varepsilon-\delta$ continuity). Let $\left\{x_n\right\}$ be a sequence converging at $x_0$ (such a sequence always exists, for example, $x_n=x_0$ for all $n\in\mathbb{N}$). Since $f$ is continuous at $x_0$, then
$$\forall\varepsilon>0\exists\delta>0\forall x\left(0<\left|x-x_0\right|<\delta\implies\left|f\left(x\right)-f\left(x_0\right)\right|<\varepsilon\right).\quad (*)$$
For any $\delta$ that satisfies conditions above, one can always find a natural number $\nu$ such that for arbitrary $n>\nu$,
$$\left|x_n-x_0\right|<\delta.$$
holds, since $\left\{x_n\right\}$ converges at $x_0$. Combining this with expression $(*)$, then
$$\forall\varepsilon>0\exists\nu\in\mathbb{N}\forall n\in\mathbb{N}\left(n>\nu\implies\left|f\left(x_n\right)-f\left(x_0\right)\right|<\varepsilon\right).$$
According to the definition of limit of a sequence, the expression above equivalents to $\left\{f\left(x_n\right)\right\}$, id est $f$ is sequentially continuous at $x_0$.

(Necessity) Assume that $f$ is sequentially continuous, and $f$ is not continuous at $x_0$, namely
$$\exists\varepsilon>0\forall\delta>0\exists x\left(0<\left|x-x_0\right|<\delta\land\left|f\left(x\right)-f\left(x_0\right)\right|\ge\varepsilon\right).$$
Then one can take $\delta=\frac{1}{n}$, where $n$ is an arbitrary natural number, and call the corresponding point $x_n:=x$. In this way we have defined a sequence $\left\{x_n\right\}$ such that
$$\exists\varepsilon>0\forall n\in\mathbb{N}\left(\left|x_n-x_0\right|<\frac{1}{n}\land\left|f\left(x_n\right)-f\left(x_0\right)\right|\ge\varepsilon\right).$$
By the construction above, $f\left(x_n\right)\to f\left(x_0\right)$ is false when $x_n\to x_0$, which contradicts the hypothesis of sequential continuity. Hence the proposition "If $f$ is sequentially continuous at $x_0$, then $f$ is continuous at $x_0$" holds.

$\blacksquare$
