= Frank Nelson Cole =

American mathematician

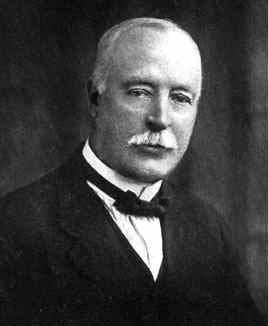
- Born: September 20, 1861; Ashland, Massachusetts, United States
- Died: May 26, 1926 (aged 64); New York City, New York, United States
- Scientific career
- Fields: Mathematics
- Workplaces: Harvard University; University of Michigan; Columbia University; American Mathematical Society
- Thesis: A Contribution to the Theory of the General Equation of the Sixth Degree (1886)
- Doctoral advisor: Felix Klein
- Doctoral students: Eric Temple Bell; Edward Kasner; George Abram Miller; Louis Weisner

Frank Nelson Cole (September 20, 1861 – May 26, 1926) was an American mathematician. He is most famous for discovering the factors of the Mersenne number 2^{67} − 1.

== Life and works ==
Cole was born in Ashland, Massachusetts. When he was very young, the family moved to Marlborough, Massachusetts where he attended school and graduated from Marlborough High School. He attended Harvard from 1878, graduating in 1882. From 1883 to 1885 he studied at Leipzig University under Felix Klein on a fellowship. He returned to Harvard, presented his thesis, and lectured on mathematics there from until 1887.

Later, he was employed at the University of Michigan (from 1888 to 1895) and Columbia University (from 1895 until his death in 1926). Professor Cole became the Secretary of the American Mathematical Society in 1895 and an editor of the Bulletin of the AMS in 1897.

Cole published a number of important papers, including The Diurnal Variation of Barometric Pressure (1892). In 1893 in Chicago, his paper On a Certain Simple Group (the group is PSL(2,8)) was read (but not by him) at the International Mathematical Congress held in connection with the World's Columbian Exposition.

On October 31, 1903, Cole famously made a presentation to a meeting of the American Mathematical Society where he identified the factors of the Mersenne number 2^{67} − 1, or M_{67}. Édouard Lucas had demonstrated in 1876 that M_{67} must have factors (i.e., is not prime), but he was unable to determine what those factors were. During Cole's so-called "lecture", he approached the chalkboard and in complete silence proceeded to calculate the value of M_{67}, with the result being 147,573,952,589,676,412,927. Cole then moved to the other side of the board and wrote 193,707,721 × 761,838,257,287, and worked through the calculations by hand. Upon completing the multiplication and demonstrating that the result equaled M_{67}, Cole returned to his seat, not having uttered a word during the hour-long presentation. His audience greeted the presentation with a standing ovation. Cole later admitted that finding the factors had taken "three years of Sundays".

Cole died in New York City, aged 64. The American Mathematical Society's Cole Prizes in Algebra and Number Theory are named in his honor.

== See also ==
- Cole Prize
