= Joseph Langley Burchnall =

English mathematician

Professor Joseph Langley Burchnall OBE, FRSE (8 December 1892 – 29 April 1975) was an English mathematician who introduced the Burchnall–Chaundy theory.

== Life ==
Burchnall was born in Whichford, Warwickshire, the son of Walter Henry Burchnall, a schoolmaster, and Ann Newport. He was the eldest of six children.

Around 1900 the family moved to Butterwick, and thereafter Joseph was educated at Boston Grammar School, then progressed to Christ Church, Oxford graduating BA in 1914 and MA (in absentia) in 1915.

He had a distinguished military history during the First World War winning the Military Cross in 1918 whilst serving in the Royal Garrison Artillery. He was wounded three times and lost a leg in March 1918.

After the war he joined Durham University as a Reader in Mathematics then progressed to be a Lecturer. He became a professor in 1939 and continued this until retirement in 1959.

He wrote many mathematical papers in conjunction with Theodore William Chaundy.

He was elected a Fellow of the Royal Society of Edinburgh in 1953. He was appointed an OBE in 1956 for services to education and the community.

He was President of the Old Bostonian Association (his old school alumni) from 1967 to 1969.

He died on 29 April 1975 in Southwold, Suffolk. He is buried in St Edmunds Church Cemetery in Southwold.

== Family ==
He married Gertrude Frances Rollinson in 1917.

They had two sons and one daughter.
