= Vladimir Fock =

Russian physicist (1898–1974)

- Born: December 22, 1898; St. Petersburg, Russian Empire
- Died: December 27, 1974 (aged 76); Leningrad, Russian SFSR, Soviet Union
- Education: Petrograd University
- Known for: Fock space Fock state Fock matrix Fock representation Fock–Lorentz symmetry Fock–Schwinger gauge Klein–Fock–Gordon equation Hartree–Fock method Mehler–Fock transform Adiabatic theorem Creeping wave Relativistic dynamics
- Scientific career
- Fields: Physicist and mathematician
- Workplaces: Petrograd University; State Institute of Optics; Leningrad Institute of Physics and Technology; Lebedev Physical Institute
- Notable students: A. D. Aleksandrov; F. I. Fedorov; Georgii Malyuzhinets; Yu. A. Yappa

Vladimir Aleksandrovich Fock (or Fok; Russian: Влади́мир Алекса́ндрович Фок) (December 22, 1898 – December 27, 1974) was a Soviet physicist, who did foundational work on quantum mechanics and quantum electrodynamics.

== Biography ==
He was born in St. Petersburg, Russia. In 1922 he graduated from Petrograd University, then continued postgraduate studies there. He became a professor there in 1932. In 1919–1923 and 1928–1941 he collaborated with the Vavilov State Optical Institute, in 1924–1936 with the Leningrad Institute of Physics and Technology, in 1934–1941 and 1944–1953 with the Lebedev Physical Institute.

== Scientific work ==
His primary scientific contribution lies in the development of quantum physics and the theory of gravitation, although he also contributed significantly to the fields of mechanics, theoretical optics, and physics of continuous media. In 1926, he derived the Klein–Gordon equation. He gave his name to Fock space, the Fock representation and Fock state, and developed the Hartree–Fock method in 1930. He made many subsequent scientific contributions during the rest of his life. Fock developed the electromagnetic methods for geophysical exploration in a book The theory of the study of the rocks resistance by the carottage method (1933), methods called well logging in modern literature.

Fock made significant contributions to general relativity theory, specifically for the many-body problems. Fock criticised on scientific grounds both Einstein's general principle of relativity, as being devoid of physical substance, and the equivalence principle, as interpreted as the equivalence of gravitation and acceleration, as having only a local validity.

In Leningrad, Fock created a scientific school in theoretical physics and raised the physics education in the USSR through his books. He wrote the first textbook on quantum mechanics Fundamentals of Quantum Mechanics (1931, 1978) and a very influential monograph The Theory of Space, Time and Gravitation (1955).

Historians of science, such as Loren Graham, see Fock as a representative and proponent of Einstein's theory of relativity within the Soviet world. At a time when most Marxist philosophers objected to relativity theory, Fock emphasized a materialistic understanding of relativity that coincided philosophically with Marxism.

He was a full member (academician) of the USSR Academy of Sciences (1939) and a member of the International Academy of Quantum Molecular Science.

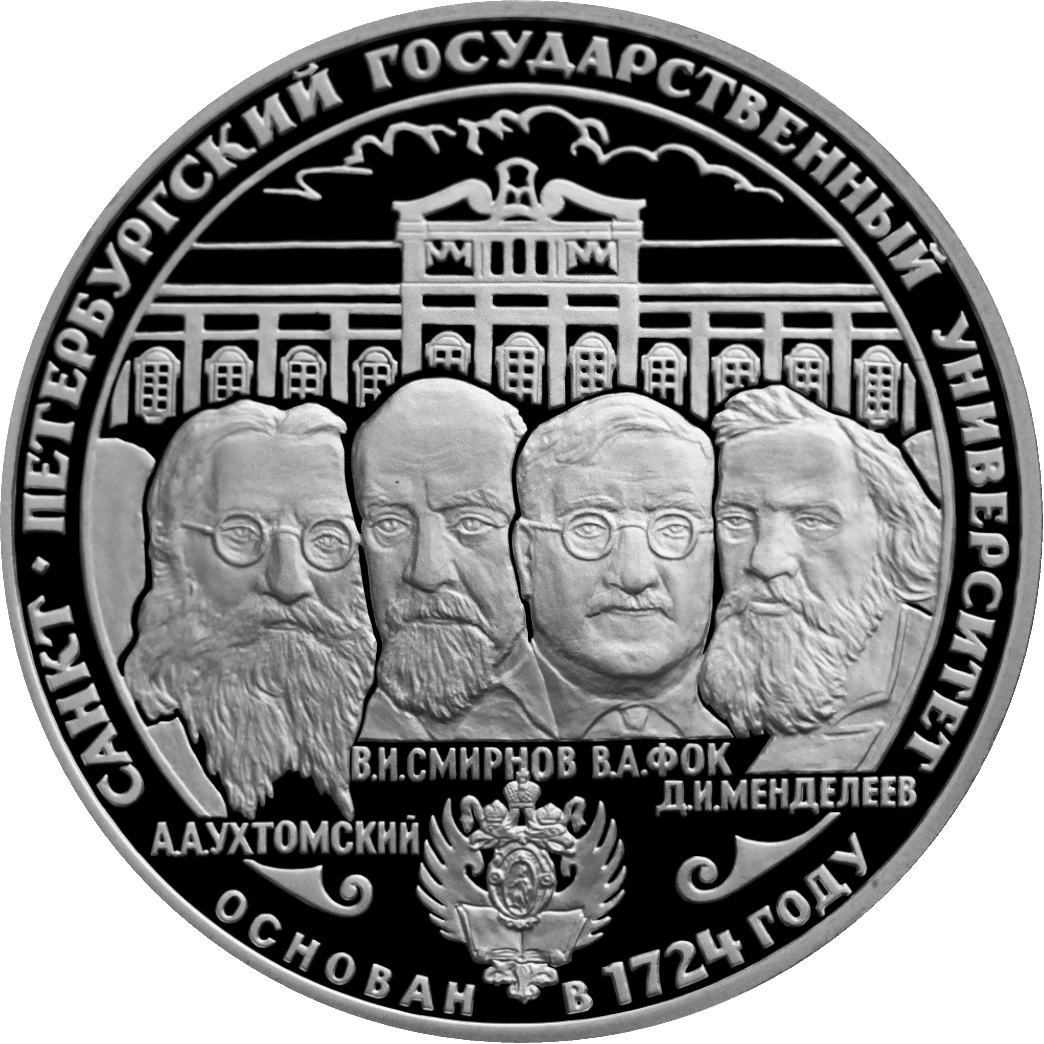
A memorial coin with Fock being second from the right

== See also ==
- List of things named after Vladimir Fock
