= Mel (surname) =

Mel is a surname. Notable people with the surname include:

- Ashantha de Mel (born 1959), Sri Lankan former cricketer
- Henry De Mel (1877–1936), Ceylonese industrialist and politician
- Lakdasa De Mel, first Bishop of Kurunegala, Sri Lanka, and son of Henry De Mel
- Melle Mel (born Melvin Glover in 1961), hip-hop musician and songwriter
- Pepe Mel (born 1963), Spanish retired footballer and current manager of Real Betis
- Peter Mel (born 1969), American surfer
- Rinaldo del Mel (probably 1554 – c. 1598), Franco-Flemish composer
- Ronnie de Mel (1925–2024), Sri Lankan politician and civil servant
- Royce de Mel (1917–?), first Sri Lankan commander of the Sri Lanka Navy
- Ruby de Mel (1917–2004), Sri Lankan actress
- Samantha de Mel (born 1965), Sri Lankan-born Italian former cricketer

== See also ==
- Mehl, surname
