= Creeping wave =

Type of electromagnetic diffraction

According to the principle of diffraction, when a wave front passes an obstruction, it spreads out into the shadowed space. A creeping wave in electromagnetism or acoustics is the wave that is diffracted radially around the surface of a smooth body such as a sphere.

Creeping waves greatly extend the ground wave propagation of long wavelength (low frequency) radio. They also cause both of a person's ears to hear a sound, rather than only the ear on the side of the head facing the origin of the sound. In radar ranging, the creeping wave return appears to come from behind the target.

The term creeping wave was coined by Walter Franz in 1952. Vladimir Fock made important contributions to the understanding and calculation of creeping waves. They are described by Airy functions.
