= Kazuhiko Aomoto =

Japanese mathematician

Kazuhiko Aomoto is a Japanese mathematician who introduced the Aomoto-Gel'fand hypergeometric function and the Aomoto integral.

He was a professor at Nagoya University. In 1996 he received the Mathematical Society of Japan autumn prize for his research on complex integration.
