= Eduard Heine =

German mathematician (1821–1881)

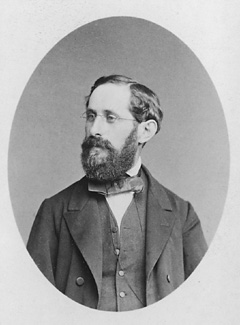
- Heinrich Eduard Heine
- Born: 16 March 1821; Berlin, Prussia
- Died: 21 October 1881 (aged 60); Halle, Prussia
- Education: University of Berlin
- Known for: Uniform continuity Heine–Borel theorem
- Awards: Gauss Medal
- Scientific career
- Fields: Mathematician
- Workplaces: University of Bonn; University of Halle
- Doctoral advisor: Enno Dirksen; Martin Ohm

Heinrich Eduard Heine (16 March 1821 – 21 October 1881) was a German mathematician.

Heine became known for results on special functions and in real analysis. In particular, he authored an important treatise on spherical harmonics and Legendre functions (Handbuch der Kugelfunctionen). He also investigated basic hypergeometric series. He introduced the Mehler–Heine formula.

== Biography ==
Heinrich Eduard Heine was born on 16 March 1821 in Berlin, as the eighth child of banker Karl Heine and his wife Henriette Märtens. Eduard was initially home schooled, then studied at the Friedrichswerdersche Gymnasium and Köllnische Gymnasium in Berlin. In 1838, after graduating from gymnasium, he enrolled at the University of Berlin, but transferred to the University of Göttingen to attend the mathematics lectures of Carl Friedrich Gauss and Moritz Stern. In 1840 Heine returned to Berlin, where he studied mathematics under Peter Gustav Lejeune Dirichlet, while also attending classes of Jakob Steiner and Johann Franz Encke. In 1842 he was awarded a PhD by the University of Berlin for a thesis on differential equations submitted with Enno Dirksen and Martin Ohm as advisors. Heine dedicated the doctoral thesis to his professor Gustav Dirichlet. Next he went to the University of Königsberg to participate in the mathematical seminar of Carl Gustav Jacobi, while also following mathematical physics classes of Franz Ernst Neumann. In Königsberg Heine got in contact with fellow students Gustav Kirchhoff and Philipp Ludwig von Seidel.

In 1844 Heine went for a teaching position at the University of Bonn, passing his habilitation and starting as a privatdozent. He continued his research in mathematics in Bonn and, in 1848, was promoted to extraordinary professor. In 1850 he married Sophie Wolff, the daughter of a Berlin merchant; the couple had five children, four daughters and one son. In 1856 Heine moved as a full professor to the University of Halle, where he remained for the rest of his life. From 1864 to 1865, he served as a rector of the university. In 1875, the University of Göttingen offered Heine a mathematics chair but he decided to reject the offer and remain in Halle. In 1877, at the centenary of Gauss's birth, he was awarded the Gauss Medal for his research. Eduard Heine died on 21 October 1881 in Halle.

== Selected works ==
- De aequationibus nonnullis differentialibus (Berlin, 1842)
- Handbuch der Kugelfunctionen (G. Reimer, Berlin, 1861)
- Handbuch der Kugelfunctionen, Theorie und Anwendungen (Volume 1) (2nd ed., G. Reimer, Berlin, 1878)
- Handbuch der Kugelfunctionen, Theorie und Anwendungen (Volume 2) (2nd ed., G. Reimer, Berlin, 1881)

== See also ==
- Basic hypergeometric series
- Andréief–Heine identity
- Heine theorem
- Heine–Borel theorem
- Heine–Cantor theorem
- Heine definition of continuity
- Heine's Reciprocal Square Root Identity
- Heine–Stieltjes polynomials
- Formalism (philosophy of mathematics)
- Limit of a function
- List of things named after Eduard Heine
