= Stephen Wizner =

Stephen Wizner is the William O. Douglas Clinical Professor of Law at Yale Law School. He also has a Special Appointment as the Sackler Professor of Law at Tel Aviv University.

== Teaching ==
Wizner teaches several clinical courses, including Advanced Advocacy for Children and Youth, Advanced Immigration Legal Services, and the Community Lawyering Clinic.

He also teaches non-clinical courses, including Ethics in the Practice of Law and Trial Practice.

== Biography ==
Wizner received his A.B. from Dartmouth College in 1959, and his J.D. from the University of Chicago in 1963.

Upon graduating from law school he worked from 1963 to 1966 as a trial attorney with the Criminal Division of the U.S. Department of Justice.

He then worked from 1966 to 1967 as Staff Attorney with the Center on Social Welfare Policy and Law at Columbia University, one of the earliest poverty law centers. There he litigated the groundbreaking case Goldberg v. Kelly, which established due process rights for welfare recipients. The theory of the case was developed by Robert Cover, who was then a student at Columbia and went on to become Wizner's colleague as a professor at Yale Law School.

He then worked from 1967 to 1970 as Managing Attorney with MFY Legal Services, Inc., New York

He started teaching at Yale Law School in 1970. Wizner was the first clinical professor at Yale Law School to have an endowed chair. The Dean at the time, Guido Calabresi, wanted to signal the school's commitment to clinical education.

Wizner's professional awards include:

- Richard S. Jacobson Trial Advocacy Teaching Award by the Roscoe Pound Trial Lawyers Foundation.
- Connecticut Bar Association's Charles J. Parker Legal Services Award (1988)
- Connecticut Law Tribune's Award for Distinguished Service to the State Bar (1994)

Wizner's son, Ben Wizner, is an attorney with the American Civil Liberties Union, and chief legal consultant of Edward Snowden.

== Academic works ==
Law As Politics: A Response To Adam Babich, 11 Clinical L. Rev. 473 (2005) (with Robert Solomon)

Teaching And Doing: The Role Of Law School Clinics In Enhancing Access To Justice, 73 Fordham L. Rev. 997 (2004) (with Jane Aiken)

Walking The Clinical Tightrope: Between Teaching And Doing, 4 U. Md. L.J. Race, Religion, Gender & Class 259 (2004)

Religious Values, Legal Ethics, And Poverty Law: A Response To Thomas Shaffer, 31 Fordham Urb. L.J. 37 (2003)

Law As Social Work, 11 Wash. U. J.L. & Pol'y 63 (2003) (with Jane Aiken)

Law School Clinic: Legal Education In The Interests Of Justice, 70 Fordham L. Rev. 1929 (2002)

Beyond Skills Training, 7 Clinical L. Rev. 327 (2001)

Can Law Schools Teach Students To Do Good? Legal Education And The Future Of Legal Services For The Poor, 3 N.Y. City L. Rev. 259 (2000)

Is Learning To "Think Like A Lawyer" Enough?, 17 Yale L. & Pol'y Rev. 583 (1998)

Rationing Justice, 1997 Ann. Surv. Am. L. 1019 (1997)

Repairing The World Through Law: A Reflection On Robert Cover's Social Activism, 8 Cardozo Stud. L. & Literature 1 (1996)

On Youth Crime And The Juvenile Court, 36 B.C. L. Rev. 1025 (1995)

Homelessness: Advocacy And Social Policy, 45 U. Miami L. Rev. 387 (1990/1991)

What Is A Law School?, 38 Emory L.J. 701 (1989)

Tributes To Robert M. Cover, 96 Yale L.J. 1699 (1987)
