= Lucy Joan Slater =

British mathematician (1922-2008)

Lucy Joan Slater (5 January 1922 – 6 June 2008) was a mathematician who worked on hypergeometric functions, and who found many generalizations of the Rogers–Ramanujan identities.

== Early life ==
Slater was born in 1922 and homeschooled for much of her early education. Her father died when she was nine years old. Slater was interested in jazz music and played the piano as an accompanist in her early years. She attended college at Bedford College and received her first B.A. from London University in 1944. During the war, she worked teaching soldiers trigonometry.

== Career ==
Her advisor was Wilfrid Norman Bailey. She received an M.A. and Ph.D. from London University while studying hypergeometric equations, including her publication of a list of over 100 Rogers-Ramanujan Identities. Later, she received a D.Litt. from London University as well. In the early 1950s she played a leading role at Cambridge University in devising a precursor of modern computer operating systems, and subsequently she helped to develop computer programs for econometrics, working for much of the time with UK government officials. She received a Ph.D. and Sc.D. from Cambridge and was named assistant director of Research in the Department of Economics in 1962.

She retired in 1982 and subsequently devoted much of her time to genealogy.

=== Writing ===
Her (unpublished) memoirs include descriptions of life as a teenager in Portsmouth during the bombing of the Second World War, and of working with early computers at Cambridge. In 1997 she completed a remarkable listing of all the graves at the Parish of the Ascension Burial Ground in Cambridge and their inscriptions in the burial ground; she wrote a paper called "A Walk round the Ascension Burial Ground, Cambridge" which describes over 100 of the graves as though the reader is walking around the burial ground and includes detailed maps. The fourth edition is dated December 1994.

== Death ==
She was buried at the Parish of the Ascension Burial Ground in Cambridge in 2008 in the same grave as her mother, Lucy Dalton Slater (1893–1975), widow of John Wardle Slater F.I.C., Admiralty chemist, buried in Portsmouth.

== Recognition ==
In 2016 the Council of the University of Cambridge approved the use of Slater's name to mark a physical feature within the North West Cambridge Development.

== Publications ==
- Slater, L. J. (1952). "Further Identities of the Rogers‐Ramanujan Type". Proceedings of the London Mathematical Society. 2 (1): 147–167. doi:10.1112/plms/s2-54.2.147.
- Slater, L. J. (1955). "Integrals for asymptotic expansions of hypergeometric functions". Proc. Amer. Math. Soc. 6 (2): 226–231. doi:10.1090/s0002-9939-1955-0069952-9. MR 0069952.
- Abramowitz, Milton; Stegun, Irene Ann, eds. (1983) [June 1964]. 503.htm "Chapter 13 Confluent hypergeometric functions". Handbook of Mathematical Functions with Formulas, Graphs, and Mathematical Tables. Applied Mathematics Series. Vol. 55 (Ninth reprint with additional corrections of tenth original printing with corrections (December 1972); first ed.). Washington D.C.; New York: United States Department of Commerce, National Bureau of Standards; Dover Publications. p. 503. ISBN 978-0-486-61272-0. LCCN 64-60036. MR 0167642. LCCN 65-12253.
- Slater, Lucy Joan (1960), Confluent hypergeometric functions, Cambridge, UK: Cambridge University Press, MR 0107026
- Slater, Lucy Joan (1966), Generalized hypergeometric functions, Cambridge, UK: Cambridge University Press, ISBN 978-0-521-06483-5, MR 0201688 (there is a 2008 paperback with ISBN 978-0-521-09061-2)
- Fortran programs for economists, Cambridge University Press, 1967
- First steps in basic Fortran, London: Chapman & Hall, 1971
- More Fortran programs for economists, Cambridge University Press, 1972
- GEM: a general econometric matrix program, Cambridge University Press, 1976
- Dynamic regression: theory and algorithms (co-author with M. H. Pesaran), Halsted Press, 1980

== See also ==
- Timeline of women in mathematics
