= Nikolai Andreyev (physicist) =

Soviet physicist (1880 – 1970)

Nikolai Nikolayevich Andreyev (28 July 1880 – 31 December 1970) was a physicist who specialized in the study of music and acoustics. The Andreyev Acoustics Institute and a research vessel Akademik Nikolai Andreyev are named after him.

Andreyev was born to a government official, Nikolai Fedorovich and Alexandra Nikitichna Konvisarova. After the death of his parents in a fire, he was brought up by relatives in Moscow. He went to the classical gymnasium and after graduating in 1892, joined the military school where he studied mathematics and European languages, apart from excelling in music. He joined the Higher Technical Institute in 1898 but was expelled for taking part in student agitations. He was influenced by Nikolai Bugaev and in 1903 he went to study at the University of Göttingen and then moved to Basel to study under August Hagenbach. He worked on optics and examined approaches to identification of active components using polarization measurements. After receiving his doctorate he worked in Moscow in the laboratory of Pyotr Lebedev. During World War I he was involved in developing methods for locating guns using sounds. From 1918 he was professor of physics at Omsk and in 1920 he moved to Moscow to study acoustics with Abram Ioffe. He also studied piezoelectricity, microphones, and the production of sounds by animals. He received a Order of Lenin in 1945 and 1953 and was decorated Hero of Socialist Labour in 1970.

== Scientific Activity ==
His main research focused on acoustics (hydroacoustics, architectural, biological, and nonlinear acoustics). He developed a rigorous theory of sound propagation in moving media. He conducted studies on the theory of sound propagation along absorbing surfaces, the theory of acoustic filters, and finite-amplitude sound waves. A number of his works dealt with the study of the spectrum of damped oscillations, vibrations in crystalline and anisotropic media, as well as issues of sound reverberation and sound insulation. Under his leadership, research in nonlinear acoustics, sound propagation in layered media, and electromechanical active materials was initiated in the country. He founded a scientific school in the field of physical and technical acoustics.

During the First World War, Andreev headed a gas-mask laboratory and worked on the development of a dosimeter for toxic gases. From 1927 to 1934, he took part in compiling the Technical Encyclopedia edited by L. K. Martens, authoring articles in the fields of physics and acoustics. In 1931, at his initiative, the Research Institute of the Musical Industry (NIIMP) was established.

During the Second World War, he organized several scientific and technical groups that operated under his leadership within active naval fleets (the Black Sea, Baltic, and Caspian fleets). For this work, Nikolai Nikolaevich was awarded the Order of the Red Banner of Labor.
