= Heine's identity =

Fourier expansion of a reciprocal square root

In mathematical analysis, Heine's identity, named after Eduard Heine, is a Fourier expansion of a reciprocal square root:

$$\frac{1}{\sqrt{z-\cos\psi}} = \frac{\sqrt{2}}{\pi}\sum_{m=-\infty}^\infty Q_{m-\frac12}(z) e^{im\psi},$$

where $Q_{m-1/2}$ is a Legendre function of the second kind and $z\in\R_{>1}$. This expression can be generalized for arbitrary half-integer powers as follows:

$$(z-\cos\psi)^{n-\frac12} = \sqrt{\frac{2}{\pi}}\frac{(z^2-1)^{\frac{n}{2}}}{\Gamma(\frac12-n)}
\sum_{m=-\infty}^{\infty} \frac{\Gamma(m-n+\frac12)}{\Gamma(m+n+\frac12)}Q_{m-\frac12}^n(z)e^{im\psi},$$

where $\Gamma$ is the gamma function.
