= Mehl =

Mehl (German for "flour") is a German and Norwegian surname. Notable people with the surname include:

- B. Max Mehl (1884–1957), American coin dealer
- Eberhard Mehl (1935–2002), German fencer
- Emilie Enger Mehl (born 1993), Norwegian politician
- Fenito Mehl (born 1997), South African cricketer
- Gabriele Mehl (born 1967), German rower
- Jeppe Mehl (born 1986), Danish footballer
- Lance Mehl (born 1958), American football player
- Lewis Mehl-Madrona, American professor and writer
- Maurice Mehl (1887–1966), American paleontologist
- Michael Mehl (born 1999), Canadian squash player and coach
- Paul Mehl (1912–1972), German footballer
- Robert Franklin Mehl (1898–1976), American metallurgist
- Ronald D. Mehl (1944–2003), American pastor
- Timmy Mehl (born 1995), American soccer player

== Other ==
- French destroyer Capitaine Mehl
- Mehl-Mülhens-Rennen, a horse race in Germany
- Meinolf Mehls (born 1965), retired German football midfielder
- Myanma Economic Holdings Limited

== See also ==
- Mel (surname)
