= Ben Wizner =

American lawyer and civil liberties advocate

- Born: 1971 (age 54–55); New Haven, Connecticut
- Education: Harvard College, New York University School of Law
- Occupations: Lawyer, writer, civil rights advocate
- Employers: American Civil Liberties Union (2011–); New York University School of Law

Ben Wizner (born 1971) is an American civil liberties lawyer, writer, and advocate with the American Civil Liberties Union. Since July 2013, he has been the lead attorney of NSA whistleblower Edward Snowden. He is known for his work on issues involving privacy, free speech, and national security.

== Early life and education ==
Wizner was born in 1971 in New Haven, Connecticut, and grew up on the campus of Yale University, where his father, Stephen Wizner, is a professor of law at Yale Law School and his mother is a dean. In New Haven, he attended Hopkins School. He has described being drawn to social justice work from at least as early as high school; after graduating Harvard College in 1993, he worked for an organization that provided legal assistance to homeless and near-homeless people. At New York University School of Law, he planned to work in legal services for impoverished communities, and on capital punishment cases. After graduating, he clerked for judge Stephen Reinhardt of the United States Court of Appeals for the Ninth Circuit.

== Career ==
Wizner began his legal career at the American Civil Liberties Union (ACLU) in Los Angeles in August 2001, focusing initially on jail and prison reform. After the September 11 attacks, his work shifted to civil liberties issues related to the treatment of Muslim Americans and national security legislation. He moved to the ACLU’s national office in 2004, and joined the newly established National Security Project, where he worked on detention, interrogation, and watch list issues, including representing torture victims and Guantanamo Bay detainees.

Wizner became director of the ACLU's Speech, Privacy, and Technology Project in 2011. In this role, he concentrated on the intersection of technology and civil liberties. He then became Edward Snowden’s principal legal adviser in July 2013. He coordinated legal support and media communications, and managed Snowden’s participation in public events. He has been a critic of government mass surveillance, arguing that Snowden’s disclosures provided evidence necessary for legal challenges. Wizner has also spoken against the use of the Espionage Act against whistleblowers and advocated for legal reforms to allow a public interest defense.

Wizner was an adjunct professor at New York University School of Law as of 2018. As of October 2025, Wizner is deputy legal director and director of the Center for Democracy at the ACLU.

== Public commentary ==
He has been a contributor to Lawfare, Time, the Freedom of the Press Foundation, and several other media outlets. He has also testified before the United States Congress. Wizner participated in an Intelligence Squared U.S. debate in February 2014, arguing in favor of Edward Snowden's actions.

He provided legal guidance on the First Amendment to student protesters during The National School Walkout on CNN.

After the United States Department of Justice sued Edward Snowden over his memoir, Wizner said the book contained no new classified information and Snowden was wary of the government's review process. Earlier that year, Wizner and the ACLU, with the 'Knight First Amendment Institute, had sued to challenge the constitutionality of the government’s pre-publication review system.

In June 2020, Wizner said the government’s effort to block John Bolton’s memoir was to prevent scandal, not protect national security. In July 2020, he stated the government could not imprison Michael Cohen for writing about President Trump. He described the arrest of activist Mahmoud Khalil as "unprecedented, illegal, and un-American" in 2025.

He has spoken at events such as the National Liberty Museum’s panel on free speech and the Fast Company Innovation Festival in 2025.
