= Horn function =

In the theory of special functions in mathematics, the Horn functions (named for Jakob Horn) are the 34 distinct convergent hypergeometric series of order two (i.e. having two independent variables), enumerated by Horn (1931) (corrected by Borngässer (1933)). They are listed in (Erdélyi et al. 1953, section 5.7.1). B. C. Carlson revealed a problem with the Horn function classification scheme. The total 34 Horn functions can be further categorised into 14 complete hypergeometric functions and 20 confluent hypergeometric functions. The complete functions, with their domain of convergence, are:

- $F_1(\alpha;\beta,\beta';\gamma;z,w)\equiv\sum_{m=0}^{\infty}\sum_{n=0}^{\infty}\frac{(\alpha)_{m+n}(\beta)_m(\beta')_n}{(\gamma)_{m+n}}\frac{z^mw^n}{m!n!}/;|z|<1\land|w|<1$
- $F_2(\alpha;\beta,\beta';\gamma,\gamma';z,w)\equiv\sum_{m=0}^{\infty}\sum_{n=0}^{\infty}\frac{(\alpha)_{m+n}(\beta)_m(\beta')_n}{(\gamma)_m(\gamma')_n}\frac{z^mw^n}{m!n!}/;|z|+|w|<1$
- $F_3(\alpha,\alpha';\beta,\beta';\gamma;z,w)\equiv\sum_{m=0}^{\infty}\sum_{n=0}^{\infty}\frac{(\alpha)_m(\alpha')_n(\beta)_m(\beta')_n}{(\gamma)_{m+n}}\frac{z^mw^n}{m!n!}/;|z|<1\land|w|<1$
- $F_4(\alpha;\beta;\gamma,\gamma';z,w)\equiv\sum_{m=0}^{\infty}\sum_{n=0}^{\infty}\frac{(\alpha)_{m+n}(\beta)_{m+n}}{(\gamma)_m(\gamma')_n}\frac{z^mw^n}{m!n!}/;\sqrt{|z|}+\sqrt{|w|}<1$
- $G_1(\alpha;\beta,\beta';z,w)\equiv\sum_{m=0}^{\infty}\sum_{n=0}^{\infty}(\alpha)_{m+n}(\beta)_{n-m}(\beta')_{m-n}\frac{z^mw^n}{m!n!}/;|z|+|w|<1$
- $G_2(\alpha,\alpha';\beta,\beta';z,w)\equiv\sum_{m=0}^{\infty}\sum_{n=0}^{\infty}(\alpha)_m(\alpha')_n(\beta)_{n-m}(\beta')_{m-n}\frac{z^mw^n}{m!n!}/;|z|<1\land|w|<1$
- $G_3(\alpha,\alpha';z,w)\equiv\sum_{m=0}^{\infty}\sum_{n=0}^{\infty}(\alpha)_{2n-m}(\alpha')_{2m-n}\frac{z^mw^n}{m!n!}/;27|z|^2|w|^2+18|z||w|\pm4(|z|-|w|)<1$
- $H_1(\alpha;\beta;\gamma;\delta;z,w)\equiv\sum_{m=0}^{\infty}\sum_{n=0}^{\infty}\frac{(\alpha)_{m-n}(\beta)_{m+n}(\gamma)_n}{(\delta)_m}\frac{z^mw^n}{m!n!}/;4|z||w|+2|w|-|w|^2<1$
- $H_2(\alpha;\beta;\gamma;\delta;\epsilon;z,w)\equiv\sum_{m=0}^{\infty}\sum_{n=0}^{\infty}\frac{(\alpha)_{m-n}(\beta)_m(\gamma)_n(\delta)_n}{(\delta)_m}\frac{z^mw^n}{m!n!}/;1/|w|-|z|<1$
- $H_3(\alpha;\beta;\gamma;z,w)\equiv\sum_{m=0}^{\infty}\sum_{n=0}^{\infty}\frac{(\alpha)_{2m+n}(\beta)_n}{(\gamma)_{m+n}}\frac{z^mw^n}{m!n!}/;|z|+|w|^2-|w|<0$
- $H_4(\alpha;\beta;\gamma;\delta;z,w)\equiv\sum_{m=0}^{\infty}\sum_{n=0}^{\infty}\frac{(\alpha)_{2m+n}(\beta)_n}{(\gamma)_m(\delta)_n}\frac{z^mw^n}{m!n!}/;4|z|+2|w|-|w|^2<1$
- $H_5(\alpha;\beta;\gamma;z,w)\equiv\sum_{m=0}^{\infty}\sum_{n=0}^{\infty}\frac{(\alpha)_{2m+n}(\beta)_{n-m}}{(\gamma)_n}\frac{z^mw^n}{m!n!}/;16|z|^2-36|z||w|\pm(8|z|-|w|+27|z||w|^2)<-1$
- $H_6(\alpha;\beta;\gamma;z,w)\equiv\sum_{m=0}^{\infty}\sum_{n=0}^{\infty}(\alpha)_{2m-n}(\beta)_{n-m}(\gamma)_n\frac{z^mw^n}{m!n!}/;|z||w|^2+|w|<1$
- $H_7(\alpha;\beta;\gamma;\delta;z,w)\equiv\sum_{m=0}^{\infty}\sum_{n=0}^{\infty}\frac{(\alpha)_{2m-n}(\beta)_n(\gamma)_n}{(\delta)_m}\frac{z^mw^n}{m!n!}/;4|z|+2/|s|-1/|s|^2<1$

while the confluent functions include:

- $\Phi_{1}\left(\alpha;\beta;\gamma;x, y\right)\equiv\sum_{m=0}^{\infty} \sum_{n=0}^{\infty} \frac{(\alpha)_{m+n}(\beta)_{m}}{(\gamma)_{m+n}} \frac{x^{m} y^{n}}{m ! n !}$
- $\Phi_{2}\left(\beta,\beta';\gamma;x, y\right)\equiv\sum_{m=0}^{\infty} \sum_{n=0}^{\infty} \frac{(\beta)_{m}(\beta')_{n}}{(\gamma)_{m+n}} \frac{x^{m} y^{n}}{m ! n !}$
- $\Phi_{3}\left(\beta;\gamma;x, y\right)\equiv\sum_{m=0}^{\infty} \sum_{n=0}^{\infty} \frac{(\beta)_{m}}{(\gamma)_{m+n}} \frac{x^{m} y^{n}}{m ! n !}$
- $\Psi_{1}\left(\alpha;\beta;\gamma,\gamma';x, y\right)\equiv\sum_{m=0}^{\infty} \sum_{n=0}^{\infty} \frac{(\alpha)_{m+n}(\beta)_{m}}{(\gamma)_{m}(\gamma')_{n}} \frac{x^{m} y^{n}}{m ! n !}$
- $\Psi_{2}\left(\alpha;\gamma,\gamma';x, y\right)\equiv\sum_{m=0}^{\infty} \sum_{n=0}^{\infty} \frac{(\alpha)_{m+n}}{(\gamma)_{m}(\gamma')_{n}} \frac{x^{m} y^{n}}{m ! n !}$
- $\Xi_{1}\left(\alpha,\alpha';\beta;\gamma;x, y\right)\equiv\sum_{m=0}^{\infty} \sum_{n=0}^{\infty} \frac{(\alpha)_{m}(\alpha')_{n}(\beta)_m}{(\gamma)_{m+n}(\gamma')_{n}} \frac{x^{m} y^{n}}{m ! n !}$
- $\Xi_{2}\left(\alpha;\beta;\gamma;x, y\right)\equiv\sum_{m=0}^{\infty} \sum_{n=0}^{\infty} \frac{(\alpha)_{m}(\alpha)_{m}}{(\gamma)_{m+n}} \frac{x^{m} y^{n}}{m ! n !}$
- $\Gamma_{1}\left(\alpha;\beta,\beta';x, y\right)\equiv\sum_{m=0}^{\infty} \sum_{n=0}^{\infty} (\alpha)_m (\beta)_{n-m}(\beta')_{m-n}\frac{x^{m} y^{n}}{m ! n !}$
- $\Gamma_{2}\left(\beta,\beta';x, y\right)\equiv\sum_{m=0}^{\infty} \sum_{n=0}^{\infty}(\beta)_{n-m}(\beta')_{m-n}\frac{x^{m} y^{n}}{m ! n !}$
- $H_{1}\left(\alpha;\beta;\delta ;x, y\right)\equiv\sum_{m=0}^{\infty} \sum_{n=0}^{\infty} \frac{(\alpha)_{m-n}(\beta)_{m+n}}{(\delta)_m} \frac{x^{m} y^{n}}{m ! n !}$
- $H_{2}\left(\alpha;\beta;\gamma;\delta;x, y\right)\equiv\sum_{m=0}^{\infty} \sum_{n=0}^{\infty} \frac{(\alpha)_{m-n}(\beta)_{m}(\gamma)_n}{(\delta)_m} \frac{x^{m} y^{n}}{m ! n !}$
- $H_{3}\left(\alpha;\beta;\delta;x, y\right)\equiv\sum_{m=0}^{\infty} \sum_{n=0}^{\infty} \frac{(\alpha)_{m-n}(\beta)_{m}}{(\delta)_{m}} \frac{x^{m} y^{n}}{m ! n !}$
- $H_{4}\left(\alpha;\gamma;\delta ;x, y\right)\equiv\sum_{m=0}^{\infty} \sum_{n=0}^{\infty} \frac{(\alpha)_{m-n}(\gamma)_{n}}{(\delta)_n} \frac{x^{m} y^{n}}{m ! n !}$
- $H_{5}\left(\alpha;\delta;x, y\right)\equiv\sum_{m=0}^{\infty} \sum_{n=0}^{\infty} \frac{(\alpha)_{m-n}}{(\delta)_m} \frac{x^{m} y^{n}}{m ! n !}$
- $H_{6}\left(\alpha;\gamma;x, y\right)\equiv\sum_{m=0}^{\infty} \sum_{n=0}^{\infty}\frac{(\alpha)_{2m+n}}{(\gamma)_{m+n}} \frac{x^{m} y^{n}}{m ! n !}$
- $H_{7}\left(\alpha;\gamma;\delta;x, y\right)\equiv\sum_{m=0}^{\infty} \sum_{n=0}^{\infty}\frac{(\alpha)_{2m+n}}{(\gamma)_m(\delta)_n} \frac{x^{m} y^{n}}{m ! n !}$
- $H_{8}\left(\alpha;\beta;x, y\right)\equiv\sum_{m=0}^{\infty} \sum_{n=0}^{\infty} (\alpha)_{2m-n}(\beta)_{n-m} \frac{x^{m} y^{n}}{m ! n !}$
- $H_{9}\left(\alpha;\beta;\delta;x, y\right)\equiv\sum_{m=0}^{\infty} \sum_{n=0}^{\infty} \frac{(\alpha)_{2m-n}(\beta)_{n}}{(\delta)_m} \frac{x^{m} y^{n}}{m ! n !}$
- $H_{10}\left(\alpha;\delta;x, y\right)\equiv\sum_{m=0}^{\infty} \sum_{n=0}^{\infty}\frac{(\alpha)_{2m-n}}{(\delta)_{m}} \frac{x^{m} y^{n}}{m ! n !}$
- $H_{11}\left(\alpha;\beta;\gamma;\delta;x, y\right)\equiv\sum_{m=0}^{\infty} \sum_{n=0}^{\infty}\frac{(\alpha)_{m-n}(\beta)_n(\gamma)_n}{(\delta)_m} \frac{x^{m} y^{n}}{m ! n !}$

Notice that some of the complete and confluent functions share the same notation.
