= Heinrich Friedrich Weber =

German physicist (1843–1912)

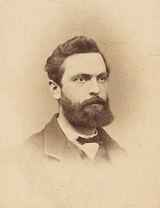
- Born: 7 November 1843; Magdala, Saxe-Weimar-Eisenach, German Confederation
- Died: 24 May 1912 (aged 68); Zurich, Switzerland
- Education: University of Jena
- Known for: Work on specific heats Weber function Weber's equations
- Scientific career
- Fields: Physicist
- Workplaces: ETH Zurich
- Thesis: Neue Probleme der Diffraktionstheorie des Lichtes (1865)
- Doctoral advisor: Ernst Abbe
- Other academic advisors: Hermann von Helmholtz

Heinrich Friedrich Weber (/ˈveɪbər/; German: [ˈveːbɐ]; 7 November 1843 – 24 May 1912) was a physicist born in the town of Magdala, near Weimar.

== Biography ==
Around 1861 he entered the University of Jena, where Ernst Abbe became the first of two physicists who decisively influenced his career (Weiss 1912, pp. 44–45). Weber soon discovered, however, that he lacked sufficient mathematical talent, and so he abandoned mathematics entirely (Weiss 1912, p. 44).

Returning to physics, Abbe found in Weber a young and dynamic scientist, one who successfully focused much of his research efforts on re-thinking optical theory. Abbe not only instructed Weber in the lecture hall and laboratory, he also served as a role model for him in several other ways: through his emphasis on the importance of laboratory work in general and precision instrumentation in particular; through his view that science should be closely related to practical life; and through his embodiment of the idea that a single individual could accomplish much in life. This last point, according to Pierre Weiss, Weber's obituarist and successor at the Eidgenössische Technische Hochschule, as the Zurich Polytechnic came to be called after 1911, was “the mainspring of his [Weber's] life, the source of his most beautiful successes” (Weiss 1912, p. 44).

Weber received his doctorate under Abbe in 1865 with a dissertation on the theory of light diffraction. He spent the second half of the 1860s as a private tutor in Pforzheim, publishing only one article during this period. Pforzheim was close to both the University of Heidelberg, where Weber came into contact with Gustav Kirchhoff, one of the leading theoretical physicists of the day, and to the Polytechnische Schule in Karlsruhe, where in 1870 he became Gustav Heinrich Wiedemann’s assistant (Weiss 1912, p. 45). At the same time, Weber also managed to meet the professor of physiology at Heidelberg, Hermann von Helmholtz, perhaps through Kirchhoff or Wiedemann, since both of them were close friends of Helmholtz's. When Helmholtz left Heidelberg in 1871 to accept the call as professor of physics at the University of Berlin, he took Weber along as his first assistant. Helmholtz now became the second formative, and decidedly primary, influence on Weber's career.

During his three years as Helmholtz's assistant in Berlin (1871–1874), Weber helped Helmholtz set up and equip the Berlin laboratory and also helped him direct the student laboratories.

In 1872 and 1874, Weber published two noteworthy papers in the Annalen der Physik on determining the specific heats of carbon, boron, and silicon at various temperatures (Weber 1872, 1874). Working in Helmholtz's refurbished Berlin laboratory, Weber measured the specific heats of these three elements and showed them to be noticeably smaller at low temperatures than predicted by the Dulong–Petit law; moreover, he found that, with an increase in temperature, their specific heats increased extraordinarily rapidly. Only when he increased the temperature beyond 1,000 degrees Celsius did the specific heats again follow the predictions of Dulong and Petit. For nearly thirty years Weber's empirical findings remained an anomaly until one of his students presented a new explanation (Weiss 1912, pp. 49–50; Pais 1982, pp. 391–392).

Weber married Anna Hochstetter in 1875. The couple had three daughters and five sons, all of which became academics: Oskar: chemist; Friedrich: geologist; Ernst: civil engineer and astronomer; Helmut and Richard: physicians.

== Weber and Einstein ==
Albert Einstein considered Weber a doctoral advisor. Following a bitter disagreement with Weber, Einstein switched to Alfred Kleiner. Heinrich Weber was both Einstein's and Mileva Marić's thesis advisor, and he gave their respective papers the two lowest essay grades in the class, with 4.5 and 4.0, respectively, on a scale of 1 to 6. Einstein also famously once commented that Weber's lectures were 50 years out of date and did not contain Maxwell's equations.
