= Winer =

Winer is a surname. Notable people with the surname include:

- Andrew Winer – American novelist
- Ben J. Winer (1917–1984), American research psychologist
- Dave Winer (born 1955), American software developer
- Eric Winer
- Georg Benedikt Winer – German Protestant theologian
- Harry Winer – American film director
- Helene Winer – Art gallery owner and curator
- Jason Winer (born 1972), American director, producer, writer
- Leslie Winer – American musician, poet, and writer
- Mark Winer – American interfaith activist and scholar
- Matt Winer (born 1969), American television personality
- Richard Winer – American author
- Russell S. Winer – American marketing scholar
- Stephen Winer, American comedy writer
- Szlama Ber Winer (1911–1942), a Polish Jew during the Holocaust
- Ward Winer – American engineer (1936–2025)

== See also ==
- 15606 Winer, a main-belt asteroid, named after American physicist Irvin M. Winer (1935–1982)
- Dilated pore of Winer
- Wiener (disambiguation)
- William Winer Cooke – Union United States Army soldier (1846–1876)
- Winer Observatory – Astronomical observatory
