= Carl Theodor Anger =

German mathematician and astronomer

Carl Theodor Anger (Danzig, 31 July 1803 – Danzig, 25 March 1858) was a German mathematician and astronomer. He was a student of and assistant to Friedrich Bessel at the Königsberg Observatory from 1827 until 1831. Thereafter, he was appointed as astronomer by the Naturforschende Gesellschaft in Danzig.

Besides his scientific work, especially that related to Bessel functions, he is also known for his first-hand biographical notes on the life of Bessel.

== Publications ==
- Anger, C. T. (1839–1841), Betrachtungen über verschiedene Gegenstände der neueren Geometrie (in German), vol. 1 & 2, Danzig: Homann
- Anger, C. T. (1846), Erinnerung an Bessel's Leben und Wirken (in German), Danzig: Weber, 30 pages
- Anger, C. T. (1847), Grundzüge der neueren astronomische Beobachtungskunst (in German), Berlin: Gernhard
- Anger, C. T. (1862), Zaddach, G. (ed.), Populäre Vorträge über Astronomie (in German), Danzig: Kafemann

== See also ==
- Anger function
- Jacobi–Anger expansion
