= Gottlieb polynomials =

Number group/set

In mathematics, Gottlieb polynomials are a family of discrete orthogonal polynomials given by

$$\displaystyle \ell_n(x,\lambda) = e^{-n\lambda}\sum_k(1-e^\lambda)^k\binom{n}{k}\binom{x}{k} =e^{-n\lambda}{}_2F_1(-n,-x;1;1-e^\lambda)$$
