= Burchnall–Chaundy theory =

In mathematics, the Burchnall–Chaundy theory of commuting linear ordinary differential operators was introduced by Burchnall and Chaundy (1923, 1928, 1931).

One of the main results says that two commuting differential operators satisfy a non-trivial algebraic relation. The polynomial relating the two commuting differential operators is called the Burchnall–Chaundy polynomial.
