= Charles F. Dunkl =

American mathematician (born 1941)

Charles F. Dunkl (born 1941 in Vienna) is a mathematician at the University of Virginia who introduced Dunkl operators.

== Selected works ==
- Dunkl, Charles F. (1966). "Operators and harmonic analysis on the sphere". Trans. Amer. Math. Soc. 125 (2): 250–263. doi:10.1090/s0002-9947-1966-0203371-9. MR 0203371.
- with Donald E. Ramirez: Topics in harmonic analysis. Appleton-Century-Crofts. 1971. ISBN 039027819X.
- with Donald E. Ramirez: Dunkl, Charles F.; Ramirez, Donald E. (1972). "Helson sets in compact and locally compact groups" (PDF). Michigan Math. J. 19 (1): 65–69. doi:10.1307/mmj/1029000799.
- Dunkl, Charles (1973). "Structure hypergroups for measure algebras". Pacific J. Math. 47 (2): 413–425. doi:10.2140/pjm.1973.47.413. MR 0336225.
- with Donald E. Ramirez: Representations of commutative semitopological semigroups. Springer-Verlag. 1975. ISBN 039027819X.
- Dunkl, Charles F. (1984). "Orthogonal polynomials on the sphere with octahedral symmetry". Trans. Amer. Math. Soc. 282 (2): 555–575. doi:10.1090/s0002-9947-1984-0732106-7. MR 0732106.
- "Orthogonal groups on the hexagon". SIAM J. Appl. Math. 42 (2): 343–351. 1987. doi:10.1137/0147022.
- Dunkl, Charles F. (1989), "Differential-difference operators associated to reflection groups", Trans. Amer. Math. Soc., 311 (1): 167–183, doi:10.2307/2001022, ISSN 0002-9947, JSTOR 2001022, MR 0951883
- Dunkl, Charles F. (1991). "Integral kernels with reflection group invariance". Can. J. Math. 43 (6): 1213–1227. doi:10.4153/CJM-1991-069-8.
- Dunkl, Charles F. (1992). "Hankel transforms associated to finite reflection groups". Contemp. Math. Contemporary Mathematics. 138: 123–138. doi:10.1090/conm/138/1199124. ISBN 9780821851593. MR 1199124.
- with M. F. E. de Jeu; E. M. Opdam: Dunkl, C. F.; De Jeu, M. F. E.; Opdam, E. M. (1994). "Singular polynomials for finite reflection groups". Trans. Amer. Math. Soc. 346 (1): 237–256. doi:10.1090/s0002-9947-1994-1273532-6. MR 1273532.
- "Intertwining operators associated to the group S_{3}". Trans. Amer. Math. Soc. 347 (9): 3347–3374. 1995. doi:10.1090/s0002-9947-1995-1316848-8. MR 1316848.
- with Yuan Xu: Orthogonal polynomials of several variables. Cambridge University Press. 2001. ISBN 0521800439.
- with E. M. Opdam: Dunkl, C. F.; Opdam, E. M. (2003). "Dunkl operators for complex reflection groups". Proc. London Math. Soc. 86: 70–108. arXiv:math/0108185. doi:10.1112/s0024611502013825. S2CID 33413119.
- Dunkl, Charles F. (2007). "Polynomials associated with dihedral groups". SIGMA. 3 (article 052): 19 pages. arXiv:math/0702107. Bibcode:2007SIGMA...3..052D. doi:10.3842/SIGMA.2007.052. S2CID 8493058.
