= Johann Baptist Mehler =

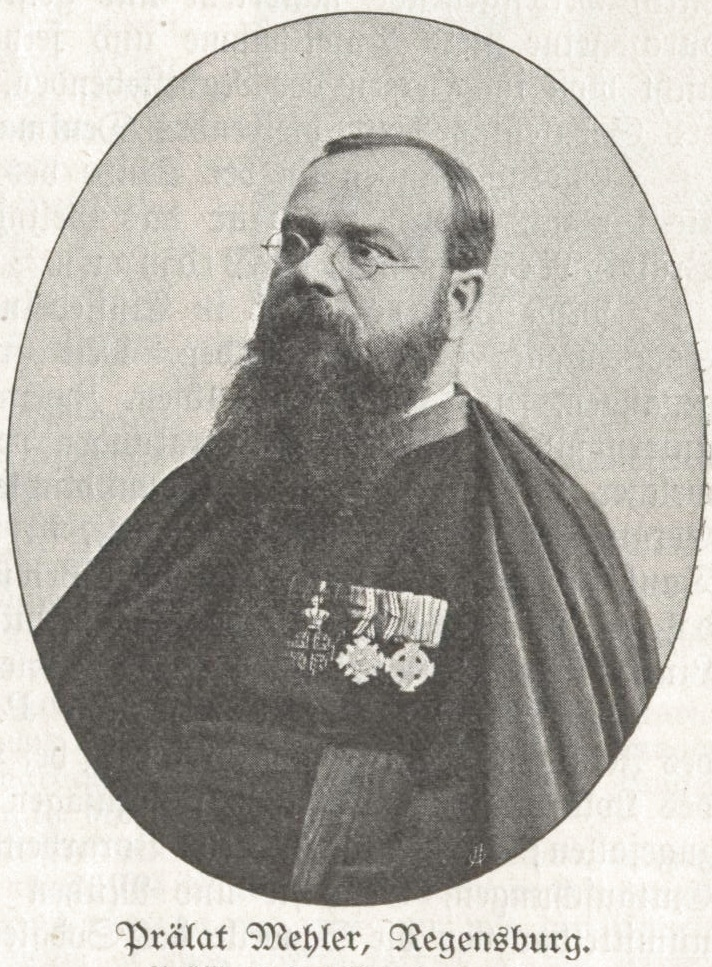
Johann Baptist Mehler

Johann Baptist Mehler (14 June 1860 in Tirschenreuth, Oberpfalz, died 15 March 1930 in Regensburg ) was a German Catholic priest, prelate, and religious writer of the Roman Catholic Diocese of Regensburg.

== Bibliography ==
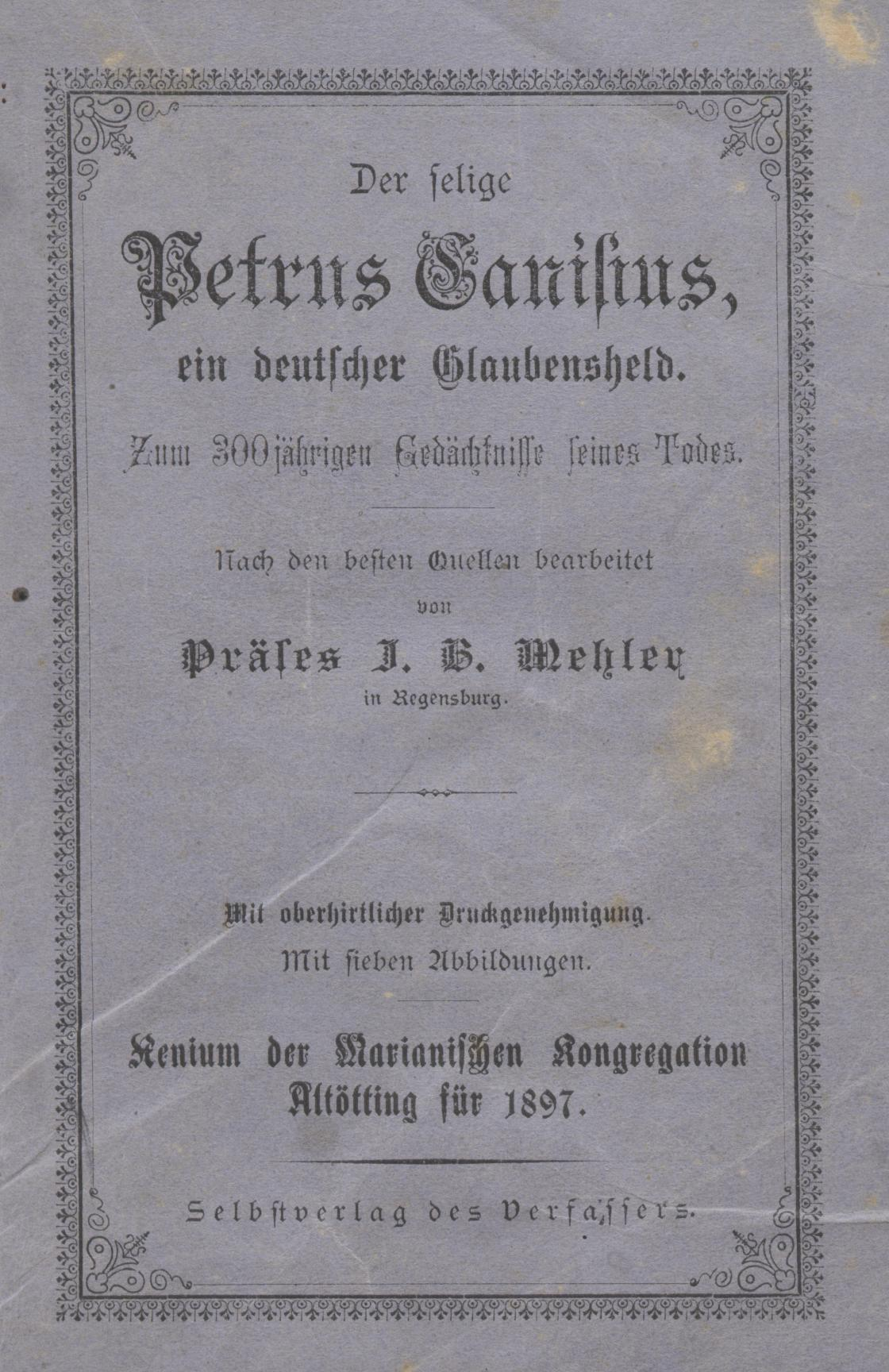
Buch von Prälat Mehler, 1897

- Don Bosco's sociale Schöpfungen, seine Lehrlingsversammlungen und Erziehungshäuser; ein Beitrag zur Lösung der Lehrlingsfrage, 1893. (Note: Don Bosco's social creations, his apprentice meetings and education buildings: a contribution to solving the question of apprentices, 1893.)
- Don Bosco, der große Jugenderzieher und Verehrer Mariens, 1893. (Note: Don Bosco, the great youth educators and admirers of Mary, 1893.)
- Der heilige Wolfgang, Bischof von Regensburg; historische Festschrift zum neunhundertjährigen Gedächtnisse seines Todes, 1894. (Note: St. Wolfgang, Bishop of Regensburg, historical writings on the nine hundred year anniversary of his death, 1894.)
- Lebensbeschreibung des frommen Bischofes Michael Wittmann von Regensburg, 1894. (Note: Life of the pious Bishop Michael Wittmann of Regensburg, 1894.)
- Die sozialdemokratische Poesie, 1894 (Note: The Socialist poetry, 1894.)
- Das Hl. Haus zu Loretto; zur 600jährigen Jubelfeier seiner Übertragung, 1896. (Note: The Holy House of Loretto, the 600th Jubilee celebration of his passing, 1896)
- Unsere liebe Frau von Lourdes, 1897. (Note: Our Lady of Lourdes, 1897.)
- Der selige Petrus Canisius, ein Apostel Deutschlands; zum 300jährigen Gedächtnisse seines Todes, 1897. (Note: Blessed Peter Canisius, an apostle of Germany; the 300th anniversary of his death, 1897.)
- Unsere Liebe Frau von Altötting das National-Heiligtum Bayerns, 1898. (Note: Our Lady of Altoetting the National Shrine in Bavaria, 1898.)
- Das fürstliche Haus Thurn und Taxis in Regensburg; zum 150 jährigen Residenz-Jubiläum, 1899. (Note: The Princely House of Thurn and Taxis in Regensburg, the 150th anniversary of residence, 1899.)
- Das 300jährige Jubiläum der Marianischen Congregation Altötting, 1899. (Note: The 300-year anniversary of the Marian Congregation Altötting, 1899.)
- Der Mariahilfberg bei Amberg und die oberpfälzischen Veteranen- und Krieger-Vereine, 1901. (Note: The Mariahilfberg at Amberg and the Upper Palatinate and war veterans associations, 1901.)
- Unsere Liebe Frau von Tuntenhausen; illustriertes Wallfahrtsbüchlein, 1901. (Note: Our Lady of Tuntenhausen; pilgrimage illustrated booklet, 1901.)
- Wallfahrtsbüchlein von Unserer Lieben Frau in Weißenregen, mit einem Anhange von Gebeten und Liedern, 1901. (Note: Pilgrimage booklet of Our Lady of Weissenregen, with an appendix of prayers and songs, 1901.)
- Gedenkblätter aus Kötztings Vergangenheit und der Pfingstritt, 1901. (Note: Pages of Testimony from Kötzting past and Pfingstritt, 1901.)
- Die Priester-Weihe in der katholischen Kirche nach dem Pontifikale Romanum, 1902. (Note: The priests ordained in the Catholic Church after the Roman Pontifical, 1902.)
- Die Bischofs-Weihe in der katholischen Kirche nach dem römischen Pontifikale, 1902. (Note: The bishop's ordination in the Catholic Church after the Roman Pontifical, 1902.)
- General Tilly, der Siegreiche, 1903. (Note: General Tilly, the Victorious, 1903.)
- Unsre Liebe Frau vom Bogenberge, Jubiläumsbüchlein für das Jahr 1904 (Note: Our Lady of Bogenberg, anniversary booklet for the year 1904.)
- Die Festfeier des 40 jährigen Priester-Jubiläums Sr. Excellenz des Hochwürdigsten Herrn Bischofes Dr. Antonius von Henle, Reichsrat der Krone Bayerns, 1914. (Note: The celebration of the 40-year anniversary of priests His Excellency the Most Reverend Bishop Dr. Anthony of Henle, Imperial Council of the Bavarian Crown, 1914.)
- Erinnerung an Joseph Leis, Grosskaufmann und Königlich Rumänischer Consul, gestorben am 7. Nov. 1915 in Regensburg, 1916. (Note: Memory of Joseph Leis, merchant and Royal Romanian Consul, died 7 November 1915 in Regensburg, 1916.)
- Maria, Landshuts Schutzfrau: Geschichte des Gnadenbildes der "Mutter mit dem geneigten Haupt" in der Ursulinenklosterkirche St. Joseph zu Landshut, 1918. (Note: Mary, protector of the women of Landshut: History of the Icon of the "Mother with the inclined head" in the Ursuline Convent of St. Joseph Church at Landshut, 1918)
- Juliana Engelbrecht, die gottbegnadete Jungfrau von Burgweinting, eine eucharistische Passionsblume und der selige Nikolaus von der Flüe; 2 Vorbilder und Fürbitter für den christlichen Bauernstand, 1919. (Note: Juliana Engelbrecht, divinely favoured the Virgin of Burgweinting, a Eucharistic Passion Flower and Blessed Nicholas of the Flue; two models and intercessors for the Christian peasantry, 1919.)
- St. Wolfgangs-Büchlein zum 925 jährigen Jubiläum unseres Bistums-Patrons (994-1919) , 1919. (Note: St. Wolfgang's booklet on 925-year anniversary of our diocese's patron (994-1919), 1919.)
- Wallfahrts-Büchlein zum heil. Salvator in Bettbrunn, 1925. (Note: Pilgrimage to the healing book. Bettbrunn Sanctuary, 1925)
- Unsere Liebe Frau von Tirschenreuth, 1928. (Note: Our Lady of Tirschenreuth, 1928.)
- Bilder aus der Kapuziner-Tätigkeit am Gnadenort Altötting, ein Stück Bayerischer und Deutscher Kirchengeschichte, 1929. (Note: Pictures from the Capuchin activity to the Shrine Altötting, a piece of Bavarian and German church history, 1929.)

== Notes ==
Book title translations
