= Louis Weisner =

Canadian mathematician

- Born: 1899
- Died: 1988 (aged 88–89)
- Education: Columbia University
- Known for: Weisner's method
- Scientific career
- Thesis: Groups whose maximal cyclic subgroups are independent (1923)
- Doctoral advisor: Frank Nelson Cole

Louis Weisner (born 1899–1988) was an American-Canadian mathematician at the University of New Brunswick who introduced Weisner's method.

He graduated in 1923 from Columbia University with a Ph.D. in mathematics. His thesis Groups whose maximal cyclic subgroups are independent was supervised by Frank Nelson Cole. As a postdoc, Weisner was an instructor at the University of Rochester. At Hunter College he was appointed an instructor in 1927 and was successively promoted to assistant professor and associate professor. When he was an associate professor in 1954, the Board of Higher Education of the City of New York charged him with "neglect of duty" and "conduct unbecoming a member of the staff" because of his alleged involvement, beginning "in or about the year 1938", with the Communist Party. From 1955 to 1988 he was a professor of mathematics at the University of New Brunswick.

== Selected publications ==
=== Articles ===
- Weisner, Louis (1924). "Group of a set of simultaneous algebraic equations". Bulletin of the American Mathematical Society. 30 (7): 314–316. doi:10.1090/S0002-9904-1924-03886-5. MR 1560907.
- —— (1925). "Groups in which the normaliser of every element except identity is abelian". Bulletin of the American Mathematical Society. 31 (8): 413–416. doi:10.1090/S0002-9904-1925-04079-3. MR 1561078.
- —— (1934). "Criteria for the irreducibility of polynomials". Bulletin of the American Mathematical Society. 40 (12): 864–870. doi:10.1090/S0002-9904-1934-05989-5. MR 1562990. S2CID 123141886.
- —— (1935). "Abstract theory of inversion of finite series". Transactions of the American Mathematical Society. 38 (3): 474–484. doi:10.1090/S0002-9947-1935-1501822-0. MR 1501822.
- —— (1935). "Some properties of prime-power groups". Transactions of the American Mathematical Society. 38 (3): 485–492. doi:10.1090/S0002-9947-1935-1501823-2. MR 1501823.
- —— (1941). "Power series the roots of whose partial sums lie in a sector". Bulletin of the American Mathematical Society. 47 (2): 160–163. doi:10.1090/S0002-9904-1941-07401-X. MR 0003799.
- —— (1942). "Roots of certain classes of polynomials". Bulletin of the American Mathematical Society. 48 (4): 283–286. doi:10.1090/S0002-9904-1942-07658-0. MR 0006779.
- —— (1955). "Group-theoretic origin of certain generating functions" (PDF). Pacific J. Math. 5 (6): 1033–1039. doi:10.2140/pjm.1955.5.1033.
- —— (1959). "Generating Functions for Hermite Functions". Canadian Journal of Mathematics. 11: 141–147. doi:10.4153/CJM-1959-018-4. S2CID 124043241.
- —— (1959). "Generating Functions for Bessel Functions". Canadian Journal of Mathematics. 11: 148–155. doi:10.4153/CJM-1959-019-1. S2CID 124839860.
- —— (1963). "Special Orthogonal Latin Squares of Order 10". Canadian Mathematical Bulletin. 6 (1): 61–63. doi:10.4153/CMB-1963-009-0.

=== Books ===
- Weisner, L. (1947). Introduction to the Theory of Equations. Macmillan. (reprint of 1938 1st edition)
