= Gould polynomials =

Family of polynomials

In mathematics, the Gould polynomials $G_n$, $n\in\N$, are polynomials introduced by Henry W. Gould. They are defined in terms of the falling factorial by

$$G_n(x;a,b) = \frac{x}{x-an}\Big(\frac{x-an}{b}\Big)_n$$.

They form the Sheffer sequence for $f(t)=e^{at}(e^{bt}-1)$, $b\neq 0$, which has generating function

$$\exp(x f^{-1}(t)) = \sum_{n=0}^{\infty} G_n(x;a,b)\frac{t^n}{n!}.$$

The inverse function is given by

$$f^{-1}(t)=\frac{1}{b}\sum_{k=1}^{\infty}\binom{-(b+ak)/b}{k-1}\frac{t^k}{k}$$.

== See also ==
- Umbral calculus
