= Dunkl operator =

Mathematical operator

In mathematics, particularly the study of Lie groups, a Dunkl operator is a certain kind of mathematical operator, involving differential operators but also reflections in an underlying space.

Formally, let G be a Coxeter group with reduced root system R and k_{v} an arbitrary "multiplicity" function on R (so k_{u} = k_{v} whenever the reflections σ_{u} and σ_{v} corresponding to the roots u and v are conjugate in G). Then, the Dunkl operator is defined by:

$$T_i f(x) = \frac{\partial}{\partial x_i} f(x) + \sum_{v\in R_+} k_v \frac{f(x) - f(x \sigma_v)}{\left\langle x, v\right\rangle} v_i$$

where $v_i$ is the i-th component of v, 1 ≤ i ≤ N, x in R^{N}, and f a smooth function on R^{N}.

Dunkl operators were introduced by Charles Dunkl (1989). One of Dunkl's major results was that Dunkl operators "commute," that is, they satisfy $T_i (T_j f(x)) = T_j (T_i f(x))$ just as partial derivatives do. Thus Dunkl operators represent a meaningful generalization of partial derivatives.
