= Eugen von Lommel =

German physicist (1837–1899)

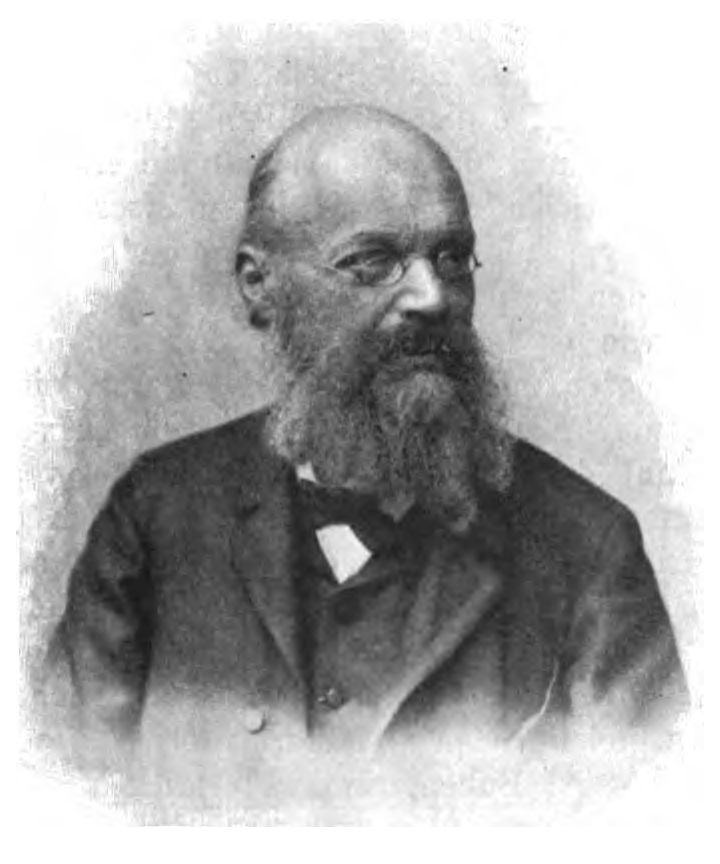
Eugen von Lommel.

Eugen Cornelius Joseph von Lommel (19 March 1837, Edenkoben – 19 June 1899, Munich) was a German physicist. He is notable for the Lommel polynomial, the Lommel function, the Lommel–Weber function, and the Lommel differential equation. He is also notable as the doctoral advisor of the Nobel Prize winner Johannes Stark.

Lommel was born in Edenkoben in the Palatinate, Kingdom of Bavaria. He studied mathematics and physics at the Ludwig-Maximilians-Universität München between 1854 and 1858. From 1860 to 1865, he is teacher of physics and chemistry at the canton school of Schwyz. From 1865 to 1867, he taught at the high school in Zurich and was simultaneously Privatdozent at the University of Zurich as well as the Federal Polytechnic School. From 1867 to 1868, he was appointed professor of physics at the University of Hohenheim. Finally, he was appointed to a chair of experimental physics at the University of Erlangen in 1868, and then went to the Ludwig-Maximilians-Universität München in 1886, where he died in Munich in 1899.

== Works by Lommel ==
- Studien über die Besselschen Funktionen, (Leipzig 1868)
- Wind und Wetter, Munich (1873)
- Das Wesen des Lichts, Leipzig (1874)
- Über die Interferenz des gebeugten Lichts, Erlangen (1874–76)
- Lexikon der Physik und Meteorologie, Leipzig (1882)
- Die Beugungserscheinungen geradlinig begrenzter Schirme, Munich (1886)
- Die Beugungsrescheinungen einer kreisrunden Öffnung, Munich (1884)
- Lehrbuch der Experimentalphysik, Leipzig (8. A. 1902)
