= Richard Burchnall =

English cricketer and educator

Personal information
- Full name: Richard Langley Burchnall
- Born: 23 August 1948 (age 78); Oxford, Oxfordshire, England
- Batting: Right-handed

Domestic team information
- Years: Team
- 1968–1971: Oxford University

Career statistics
Competition	First-class
Matches	32
Runs scored	874
Batting average	15.89
100s/50s	–/4
Top score	85
Catches/stumpings	14/–
- Source: Cricinfo, 5 January 2020

Richard Langley Burchnall (born 23 August 1948) is a former English first-class cricketer and educator.

The son of Michael Langley and Pamela Margaret (Harris) Burchnall, he was born in Oxford in August 1948. His father was employed at Winchester College as head of the English department and housemaster, with Burchnall gaining a scholarship to attend the college. From Winchester he spent a year in Africa teaching English, before returning to England to study at Lincoln College, Oxford. While studying at Oxford, Burchnall played first-class cricket for Oxford University, making his debut against Somerset in 1968. He played first-class cricket for Oxford until 1971, making 32 appearances and gaining his blue. Playing as a batsman, he scored a total of 874 runs at an average of 15.89 and a high score of 85, one of four half centuries he made.

He met his future wife while at Oxford, Jane Truscott, from South Australia. After completing their studies, the couple emigrated to Australia in January 1972, with Burchnall appointed to the post of Latin teacher at Melbourne Grammar School shortly after his arrival. He completed his graduate studies at the University of Melbourne, before returning to England where he taught for two years at Wellington College. Returning to Australia, he rose to become the head of classics at Melbourne Grammar School. He was appointed headmaster of St Peter's College, Adelaide in 1992, a position he retained until his retirement in 2004. Burchnall later served as the chairman of St Mark's College at the University of Adelaide, though he resigned from the role in June 2018, following accusations of hazing, bullying and sexual assault at the college.
