= Jakob Horn =

German mathematician

Jakob Horn (14 February 1867 – 24 February 1946) was a German mathematician who introduced Horn functions.

== Works ==
- Über systeme linearer Differentialgleichungen mit mehreren Veränderlichen: Beiträge zur Verallgemeinerungen der Fuchs'schen Theorie der linearer Differentialgleichungen. Mayer & Müller. 1890. (123 pages)
- Über die Konvergenz der hypergeometrischen Reihen zweier und dreier Veränderlichen. Leipzig: B. G. Teubner. 1889. (59 pages)
- Gewöhnliche Differentialgleichungen beliebiger Ordnung. Leipzig: G. J. Göschen. 1905.
- Einführung in die Theorie der partiellen Differentialgleichungen. Leipzig: G. J. Göschen. 1910.
- Partielle Gleichungen. G. J. Göschen. 1929.
- Gewöhnlichen Differentialgleichungen (5th ed.). G. J. Göschen. 1948. (237 pages)
