= Gustav Ferdinand Mehler =

German mathematician

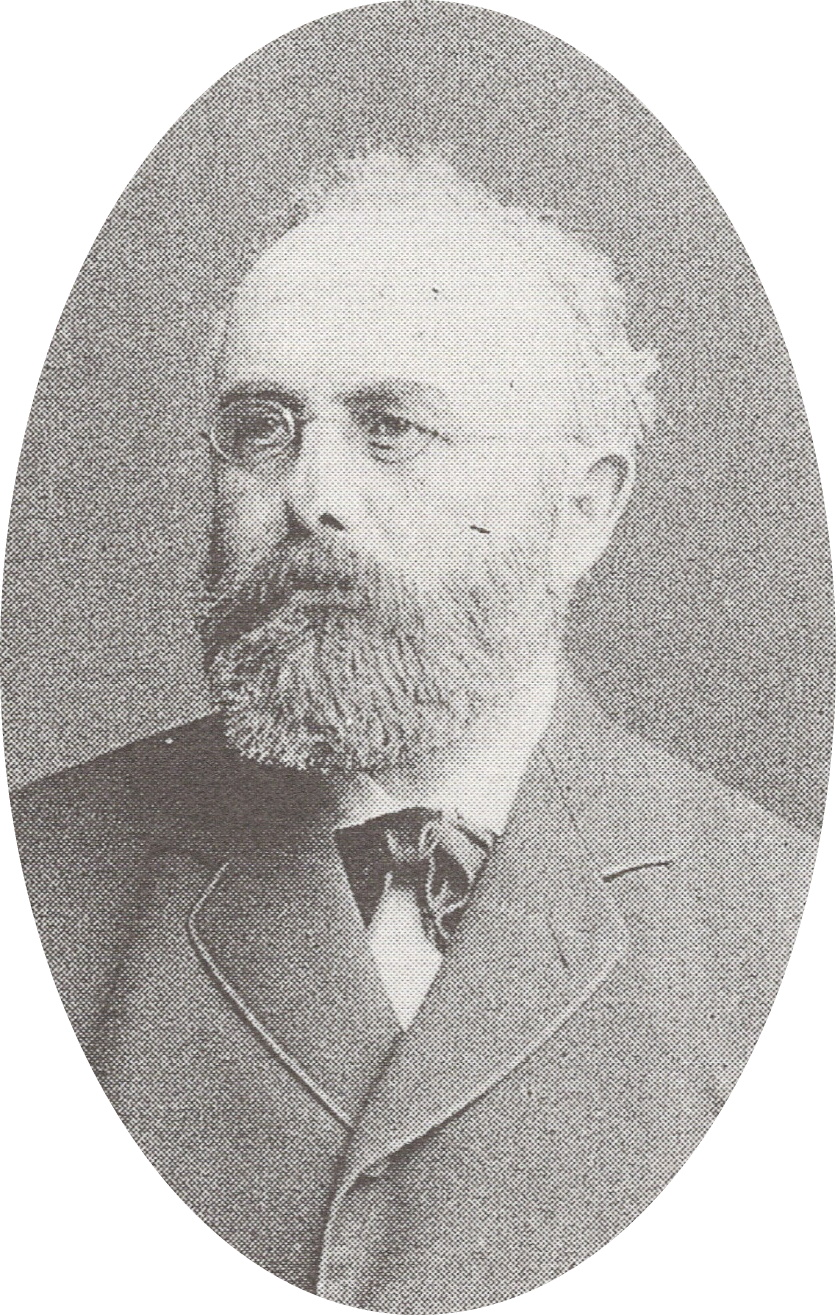
Gustav Ferdinand Mehler

Gustav Ferdinand Mehler, or Ferdinand Gustav Mehler (13 December 1835 in Schönlanke, Kingdom of Prussia – 13 July 1895 in Elbing, German Empire) was a German mathematician.

He is credited with introducing Mehler's formula; the Mehler–Fock transform; the Mehler–Heine formula; and Mehler functions (conical functions), in connection with his utilization of Zonal spherical functions in Electromagnetic theory.
