= Conical function =

Mathematical function

In mathematics, conical functions or Mehler functions are functions which can be expressed in terms of Legendre functions of the first and second kind, $P^\mu_{-(1/2)+i\lambda}(x)$ and $Q^\mu_{-(1/2)+i\lambda}(x).$

The functions $P^\mu_{-(1/2)+i\lambda}(x)$ were introduced by Gustav Ferdinand Mehler, in 1868, when expanding in series the distance of a point on the axis of a cone to a point located on the surface of the cone. Mehler used the notation $K^\mu(x)$ to represent these functions. He obtained integral representation and series of functions representations for them. He also established an addition theorem for the conical functions. Carl Neumann obtained an expansion of the functions $K^\mu(x)$ in terms of the Legendre polynomials in 1881. Leonhardt introduced for the conical functions the equivalent of the spherical harmonics in 1882.
