= General hypergeometric function =

Hypergeometric function in mathematics

In mathematics, a general hypergeometric function or Aomoto–Gelfand hypergeometric function is a generalization of the hypergeometric function that was introduced by Gelfand (1986). The general hypergeometric function is a function that is (more or less) defined on a Grassmannian, and depends on a choice of some complex numbers and signs.
