= Theodore William Chaundy =

English mathematician (1889–1966)

- Born: 19 January 1889; Oxford, England
- Died: 14 April 1966 (aged 77)
- Education: Balliol College, Oxford
- Known for: Burchnall–Chaundy theory
- Spouse: Hilda Weston Dott
- Scientific career
- Fields: Differential calculus
- Workplaces: Oxford University
- Doctoral students: Kathleen Ollerenshaw

Theodore William Chaundy (19 January 1889 – 14 April 1966) was an English mathematician who introduced Burchnall–Chaundy theory.

Chaundy was born to widowed businessman John Chaundy and his second wife Sarah Pates in their shop-cum-home at 49 Broad Street in Oxford. John had eight children, one of whom died as a toddler, with his late first wife and died barely a year after Chaundy was born. The Chaundy home along Broad Street has since been demolished.

Chaundy attended Oxford High School for Boys and read mathematics at Balliol College, Oxford on a scholarship. In 1912 he became a lecturer at Oxford and later named a Fellow of Christ Church, Oxford. He married Hilda Weston Dott (1890–1986) in 1920. They had five children and thirteen grandchildren.

== Publications ==
- Chaundy, Theodore (1935). The differential calculus. Oxford: Clarendon Press.
- Chaundy, T. W.; Barrett, P. R.; Batey, Charles (1954). The printing of mathematics. Aids for authors and editors and rules for compositors and readers at the University Press, Oxford. Oxford University Press. ISBN 9780608111261. MR 0062667.
- Chaundy, T. W. (1969). McLeod, J. Bryce (ed.). Elementary differential equations. Oxford: Clarendon Press. ISBN 978-0-19-853142-5. MR 0257444.
