= Anger function =

Plot of the Anger function J_{ν}(z) with n = 2 from −2 − 2i to 2 + 2i

In mathematics, the Anger function, introduced by C. T. Anger (1855), is a function defined as

$$\mathbf{J}_\nu(z)=\frac{1}{\pi} \int_0^\pi \cos (\nu\theta-z\sin\theta) \,d\theta$$

with complex parameter $\nu$ and complex variable $\textit{z}$. It is closely related to the Bessel functions.

The Weber function (also known as Lommel–Weber function), introduced by H. F. Weber (1879), is a closely related function defined by

$$\mathbf{E}_\nu(z)=\frac{1}{\pi} \int_0^\pi \sin (\nu\theta-z\sin\theta) \,d\theta$$

and is closely related to Bessel functions of the second kind.

== Relation between Weber and Anger functions ==
Plot of the Weber function E_{ν}(z) with n = 2 from −2 − 2i to 2 + 2i

The Anger and Weber functions are related by

$$\begin{align}
\sin(\pi \nu)\mathbf{J}_\nu(z) &= \cos(\pi\nu)\mathbf{E}_\nu(z)-\mathbf{E}_{-\nu}(z), \\
-\sin(\pi \nu)\mathbf{E}_\nu(z) &= \cos(\pi\nu)\mathbf{J}_\nu(z)-\mathbf{J}_{-\nu}(z),
\end{align}$$

so in particular if ν is not an integer they can be expressed as linear combinations of each other. If ν is an integer then Anger functions J_{ν} are the same as Bessel functions J_{ν}, and Weber functions can be expressed as finite linear combinations of Struve functions.

== Power series expansion ==
The Anger function has the power series expansion

$$\mathbf{J}_\nu(z)=\cos\frac{\pi\nu}{2}\sum_{k=0}^\infty\frac{(-1)^kz^{2k}}{4^k\Gamma\left(k+\frac{\nu}{2}+1\right)\Gamma\left(k-\frac{\nu}{2}+1\right)}+\sin\frac{\pi\nu}{2}\sum_{k=0}^\infty\frac{(-1)^kz^{2k+1}}{2^{2k+1}\Gamma\left(k+\frac{\nu}{2}+\frac{3}{2}\right)\Gamma\left(k-\frac{\nu}{2}+\frac{3}{2}\right)}.$$

While the Weber function has the power series expansion

$$\mathbf{E}_\nu(z)=\sin\frac{\pi\nu}{2}\sum_{k=0}^\infty\frac{(-1)^kz^{2k}}{4^k\Gamma\left(k+\frac{\nu}{2}+1\right)\Gamma\left(k-\frac{\nu}{2}+1\right)}-\cos\frac{\pi\nu}{2}\sum_{k=0}^\infty\frac{(-1)^kz^{2k+1}}{2^{2k+1}\Gamma\left(k+\frac{\nu}{2}+\frac{3}{2}\right)\Gamma\left(k-\frac{\nu}{2}+\frac{3}{2}\right)}.$$

== Differential equations ==
The Anger and Weber functions are solutions of inhomogeneous forms of Bessel's equation

$$z^2y^{\prime\prime} + zy^\prime +(z^2-\nu^2)y = 0 .$$

More precisely, the Anger functions satisfy the equation

$$z^2y^{\prime\prime} + zy^\prime +(z^2-\nu^2)y = \frac{(z-\nu)\sin(\pi \nu)}{\pi} ,$$

and the Weber functions satisfy the equation

$$z^2y^{\prime\prime} + zy^\prime +(z^2-\nu^2)y = -\frac{z+\nu+(z-\nu)\cos(\pi \nu)}{\pi}.$$

== Recurrence relations ==
The Anger function satisfies this inhomogeneous form of recurrence relation

$$z\mathbf{J}_{\nu-1}(z)+z\mathbf{J}_{\nu+1}(z)=2\nu\mathbf{J}_\nu(z)-\frac{2\sin\pi\nu}{\pi}.$$

While the Weber function satisfies this inhomogeneous form of recurrence relation

$$z\mathbf{E}_{\nu-1}(z)+z\mathbf{E}_{\nu+1}(z)=2\nu\mathbf{E}_\nu(z)-\frac{2(1-\cos\pi\nu)}{\pi}.$$

== Delay differential equations ==
The Anger and Weber functions satisfy these homogeneous forms of delay differential equations

$$\mathbf{J}_{\nu-1}(z)-\mathbf{J}_{\nu+1}(z)=2\dfrac{\partial}{\partial z}\mathbf{J}_\nu(z),$$
$$\mathbf{E}_{\nu-1}(z)-\mathbf{E}_{\nu+1}(z)=2\dfrac{\partial}{\partial z}\mathbf{E}_\nu(z).$$

The Anger and Weber functions also satisfy these inhomogeneous forms of delay differential equations

$$z\dfrac{\partial}{\partial z}\mathbf{J}_\nu(z)\pm\nu\mathbf{J}_\nu(z)=\pm z\mathbf{J}_{\nu\mp1}(z)\pm\frac{\sin\pi\nu}{\pi},$$
$$z\dfrac{\partial}{\partial z}\mathbf{E}_\nu(z)\pm\nu\mathbf{E}_\nu(z)=\pm z\mathbf{E}_{\nu\mp1}(z)\pm\frac{1-\cos\pi\nu}{\pi}.$$
