= Mehler–Heine formula =

Formula describing the asymptotic behavior of the Legendre polynomials

In mathematics, the Mehler–Heine formula introduced by Gustav Ferdinand Mehler and Eduard Heine describes the asymptotic behavior of the Legendre polynomials as the index tends to infinity, near the edges of the support of the weight. There are generalizations to other classical orthogonal polynomials, which are also called the Mehler–Heine formula. The formula complements the Darboux formulae which describe the asymptotics in the interior and outside the support.

== Legendre polynomials ==
The simplest case of the Mehler–Heine formula states that

$$\lim _{n\to\infty}P_n\left(\cos{\frac{z}{n}}\right)
= \lim _{n\to\infty}P_n\left(1-\frac{z^2}{2n^2}\right)
= J_0(z),$$

where P_{n} is the Legendre polynomial of order n, and J_{0} the Bessel function of order 0. The limit is uniform over z in an arbitrary bounded domain in the complex plane.

== Jacobi polynomials ==
The generalization to Jacobi polynomials P^{(α, β)}_{n} is given by Gábor Szegő as follows

$$\lim_{n \to \infty} n^{-\alpha}P_n^{(\alpha,\beta)}\left(\cos \frac{z}{n}\right)
= \lim_{n \to \infty} n^{-\alpha}P_n^{(\alpha,\beta)}\left(1-\frac{z^2}{2n^2}\right)
= \left(\frac{z}{2}\right)^{-\alpha} J_\alpha(z),$$

where J_{α} is the Bessel function of order α.

== Laguerre polynomials ==
Using generalized Laguerre polynomials and confluent hypergeometric functions, they can be written as

$$\lim_{n \to \infty} n^{-\alpha}L_n^{(\alpha)}\left(\frac{z^2}{4n}\right)
= \left(\frac{z}{2}\right)^{-\alpha} J_\alpha(z),$$

where L^{(α)}_{n} is the Laguerre function.

== Hermite polynomials ==
Using the expressions relating Hermite polynomials and Laguerre polynomials where two equations exist, they can be written as

$$\begin{align}\lim_{n \to \infty} \frac{(-1)^n}{4^nn!}\sqrt{n}H_{2n}\left(\frac{z}{2\sqrt{n}}\right)
&=\left(\frac{z}{2}\right)^{\frac{1}{2}}J_{-\frac{1}{2}}(z) \\
\lim_{n \to \infty} \frac{(-1)^n}{4^nn!}H_{2n+1}\left(\frac{z}{2\sqrt{n}}\right)
&=(2z)^{\frac{1}{2}}J_{\frac{1}{2}}(z),\end{align}$$

where H_{n} is the Hermite function.
