= Struve function =

Mathematical function

Graph of $\mathrm{H}_n(x)$ for $n\in [0,1,2,3,4,5]$

In mathematics, the Struve functions H_{α}(x), are solutions y(x) of the non-homogeneous Bessel's differential equation:

$$x^2 \frac{d^2 y}{dx^2} + x \frac{dy}{dx} + \left (x^2 - \alpha^2 \right )y = \frac{4\left (\frac{x}{2}\right)^{\alpha+1}}{\sqrt{\pi}\Gamma \left (\alpha+\frac{1}{2} \right )}$$

introduced by Hermann Struve (1882). The complex number α is the order of the Struve function, and is often an integer.

And further defined its second-kind version $\mathbf{K}_\alpha(x)$ as $\mathbf{K}_\alpha(x)=\mathbf{H}_\alpha(x)-Y_\alpha(x)$, where $Y_\alpha(x)$ is the Neumann function.

The modified Struve functions L_{α}(x) are equal to −ie^{−iαπ / 2}H_{α}(ix) and are solutions y(x) of the non-homogeneous Bessel's differential equation:

Plot of the Struve function H n(z) with n=2 in the complex plane from -2-2i to 2+2i with colors created with Mathematica 13.1 function ComplexPlot3D

$x^2 \frac{d^2 y}{dx^2} + x \frac{dy}{dx} - \left (x^2 + \alpha^2 \right )y = \frac{4\left (\frac{x}{2}\right)^{\alpha+1}}{\sqrt{\pi}\Gamma \left (\alpha+\frac{1}{2} \right )}$

And further defined its second-kind version $\mathbf{M}_\alpha(x)$ as $\mathbf{M}_\alpha(x)=\mathbf{L}_\alpha(x)-I_\alpha(x)$, where $I_\alpha(x)$ is the modified Bessel function of the first kind.

== Definitions ==
Since this is a non-homogeneous equation, solutions can be constructed from a single particular solution by adding the solutions of the homogeneous problem. In this case, the homogeneous solutions are the Bessel functions, and the particular solution may be chosen as the corresponding Struve function.

=== Power series expansion ===
Struve functions, denoted as H_{α}(z) have the power series form

$$\mathbf{H}_\alpha(z) = \sum_{m=0}^\infty \frac{(-1)^m}{\Gamma \left (m+\frac{3}{2} \right ) \Gamma \left (m+\alpha+\frac{3}{2} \right )} \left({\frac{z}{2}}\right)^{2m+\alpha+1},$$

where Γ(z) is the gamma function.

The modified Struve functions, denoted L_{α}(z), have the following power series form

$\mathbf{L}_\alpha(z) = \sum_{m=0}^\infty \frac{1}{\Gamma \left (m+\frac{3}{2} \right ) \Gamma \left (m+\alpha+\frac{3}{2} \right )} \left(\frac{z}{2}\right)^{2m+\alpha+1}.$

Plot of the modified Struve function L n(z) with n=2 in the complex plane from -2-2i to 2+2i with colors created with Mathematica 13.1 function ComplexPlot3D

=== Integral form ===
Another definition of the Struve function, for values of α satisfying Re(α) > − 1/2, is possible expressing in term of the Poisson's integral representation:

$$\mathbf{H}_\alpha(x)=\frac{2\left(\frac{x}{2}\right)^\alpha}{\sqrt\pi\Gamma\left(\alpha+\frac{1}{2}\right)}\int_0^1(1-t^2)^{\alpha-\frac{1}{2}}\sin xt~dt=\frac{2\left(\frac{x}{2}\right)^\alpha}{\sqrt\pi\Gamma\left(\alpha+\frac{1}{2}\right)}\int_0^\frac{\pi}{2}\sin(x\cos\tau)\sin^{2\alpha}\tau~d\tau=\frac{2\left(\frac{x}{2}\right)^\alpha}{\sqrt\pi\Gamma\left(\alpha+\frac{1}{2}\right)}\int_0^\frac{\pi}{2}\sin(x\sin\tau)\cos^{2\alpha}\tau~d\tau$$

$$\mathbf{K}_\alpha(x)=\frac{2\left(\frac{x}{2}\right)^\alpha}{\sqrt\pi\Gamma\left(\alpha+\frac{1}{2}\right)}\int_0^\infty(1+t^2)^{\alpha-\frac{1}{2}}e^{-xt}~dt=\frac{2\left(\frac{x}{2}\right)^\alpha}{\sqrt\pi\Gamma\left(\alpha+\frac{1}{2}\right)}\int_0^\infty e^{-x\sinh\tau}\cosh^{2\alpha}\tau~d\tau$$

$$\mathbf{L}_\alpha(x)=\frac{2\left(\frac{x}{2}\right)^\alpha}{\sqrt\pi\Gamma\left(\alpha+\frac{1}{2}\right)}\int_0^1(1-t^2)^{\alpha-\frac{1}{2}}\sinh xt~dt=\frac{2\left(\frac{x}{2}\right)^\alpha}{\sqrt\pi\Gamma\left(\alpha+\frac{1}{2}\right)}\int_0^\frac{\pi}{2}\sinh(x\cos\tau)\sin^{2\alpha}\tau~d\tau=\frac{2\left(\frac{x}{2}\right)^\alpha}{\sqrt\pi\Gamma\left(\alpha+\frac{1}{2}\right)}\int_0^\frac{\pi}{2}\sinh(x\sin\tau)\cos^{2\alpha}\tau~d\tau$$

$$\mathbf{M}_\alpha(x)=-\frac{2\left(\frac{x}{2}\right)^\alpha}{\sqrt\pi\Gamma\left(\alpha+\frac{1}{2}\right)}\int_0^1(1-t^2)^{\alpha-\frac{1}{2}}e^{-xt}~dt=-\frac{2\left(\frac{x}{2}\right)^\alpha}{\sqrt\pi\Gamma\left(\alpha+\frac{1}{2}\right)}\int_0^\frac{\pi}{2}e^{-x\cos\tau}\sin^{2\alpha}\tau~d\tau=-\frac{2\left(\frac{x}{2}\right)^\alpha}{\sqrt\pi\Gamma\left(\alpha+\frac{1}{2}\right)}\int_0^\frac{\pi}{2}e^{-x\sin\tau}\cos^{2\alpha}\tau~d\tau$$

== Asymptotic forms ==
For small x, the power series expansion is given above.

For large x, one obtains:

$$\mathbf{H}_\alpha(x) - Y_\alpha(x) = \frac{\left(\frac{x}{2}\right)^{\alpha-1}}{\sqrt{\pi} \Gamma \left (\alpha+\frac{1}{2} \right )} + O\left(\left (\tfrac{x}{2}\right)^{\alpha-3}\right),$$

where Y_{α}(x) is the Neumann function.

== Properties ==
The Struve functions satisfy the following recurrence relations:

$$\begin{align}
\mathbf{H}_{\alpha -1}(x) + \mathbf{H}_{\alpha+1}(x) &= \frac{2\alpha}{x} \mathbf{H}_\alpha (x) + \frac{\left (\frac{x}{2}\right)^{\alpha}}{\sqrt{\pi}\Gamma \left (\alpha + \frac{3}{2} \right )}, \\
\mathbf{H}_{\alpha -1}(x) - \mathbf{H}_{\alpha+1}(x) &= 2 \frac{d}{dx} \left (\mathbf{H}_\alpha(x) \right) - \frac{ \left( \frac{x}{2} \right)^\alpha}{\sqrt{\pi}\Gamma \left (\alpha + \frac{3}{2} \right )}.
\end{align}$$

== Relation to other functions ==
Struve functions of integer order can be expressed in terms of Weber functions E_{n} and vice versa: if n is a non-negative integer then

$$\begin{align}
\mathbf{E}_n(z)    &= \frac{1}{\pi} \sum_{k=0}^{\left \lfloor \frac{n-1}{2} \right \rfloor} \frac{\Gamma \left (k+ \frac{1}{2} \right) \left (\frac{z}{2} \right )^{n-2k-1}}{\Gamma \left (n- k + \frac{1}{2}\right )} -\mathbf{H}_n(z),\\
\mathbf{E}_{-n}(z) &= \frac{(-1)^{n+1}}{\pi}\sum_{k=0}^{\left \lceil \frac{n-3}{2} \right \rceil} \frac{\Gamma(n-k-\frac{1}{2}) \left (\frac{z}{2} \right )^{-n+2k+1}}{\Gamma \left (k+ \frac{3}{2} \right)}-\mathbf{H}_{-n}(z).
\end{align}$$

Struve functions of order n + 1/2 where n is an integer can be expressed in terms of elementary functions. In particular if n is a non-negative integer then

$$\mathbf{H}_{-n-\frac{1}{2}} (z) = (-1)^n J_{n+\frac{1}{2}}(z),$$

where the right hand side is a spherical Bessel function.

Struve functions (of any order) can be expressed in terms of the generalized hypergeometric function _{1}F_{2}:

$$\mathbf{H}_{\alpha}(z) = \frac{z^{\alpha+1}}{2^{\alpha}\sqrt{\pi} \Gamma \left (\alpha+\tfrac{3}{2} \right )} {}_1F_2 \left (1;\tfrac{3}{2}, \alpha+\tfrac{3}{2};-\tfrac{z^2}{4} \right ).$$

== Applications ==
The Struve and Weber functions were shown to have an application to beamforming in., and in describing the effect of confining interface on Brownian motion of colloidal particles at low Reynolds numbers.
