= Mehler–Fock transform =

In mathematics, the Mehler–Fock transform is an integral transform introduced by Mehler (1881) and rediscovered by Fock (1943).

It is given by

$$F(x) =\int_0^\infty P_{\mathrm{i}t-1/2}(x)f(t) dt,\quad (1 \leq x \leq \infty),$$

where P is a Legendre function of the first kind.

Under appropriate conditions, the following inversion formula holds:

$$f(t) = t \tanh(\pi t) \int_1^\infty  P_{\mathrm{i}t-1/2}(x)F(x) dx ,\quad (0 \leq t \leq \infty).$$
