= Lommel polynomial =

Concept in mathematics

A Lommel polynomial R_{m,ν}(z) is a polynomial in 1/z giving the recurrence relation

$$\displaystyle J_{m+\nu}(z) = J_\nu(z)R_{m,\nu}(z) - J_{\nu-1}(z)R_{m-1,\nu+1}(z)$$

where J_{ν}(z) is a Bessel function of the first kind.

They are given explicitly by

$$R_{m,\nu}(z) = \sum_{n=0}^{[m/2]}\frac{(-1)^n(m-n)!\Gamma(\nu+m-n)}{n!(m-2n)!\Gamma(\nu+n)}(z/2)^{2n-m}.$$

== See also ==
- Lommel function
- Neumann polynomial
