= Bessel =

Bessel may refer to:

== Mathematics and science ==
- Bessel beam
- Bessel ellipsoid
- Bessel function in mathematics
- Bessel's inequality in mathematics
- Bessel's correction in statistics
- Bessel filter, a linear filter often used in audio crossover systems
- Bessel transform, also known as Fourier-Bessel transform or Hankel transform
- Bessel window, in signal processing
- Besselian date, see Epoch (astronomy)#Besselian years

== Places ==
- Bessel Fjord, NE Greenland
- Bessel Fjord, NW Greenland
- Bessel (crater), a small lunar crater

== People ==
=== Surname ===
- Friedrich Wilhelm Bessel (1784–1846), German mathematician, astronomer, and systematizer of the Bessel functions
- Johann Franz Bessel (1672–1749), German Benedictine abbot and historian
- Vasily Bessel (1843–1907), Russian music publisher

=== Given name ===
- Bessel Kok (born 1941), Dutch businessman and chess organiser
- Bessel van der Kolk (born 1943), Dutch psychiatrist

== Other uses ==
- 1552 Bessel, an asteroid
- MV Bessel, a German merchant ship in service 1928–45, latterly for the Kriegsmarine
- V. Bessel and Co., a musical publishing firm co-founded by Vasily Bessel

== See also ==
- Bessell
