= Fraunhofer =

Fraunhofer may refer to:

- Joseph von Fraunhofer (1787–1826), German physicist
- Fraunhofer (crater), a lunar crater
- Fraunhofer Society (Fraunhofer-Gesellschaft), a large German research organization
- Fraunhofer diffraction, far-field diffraction
- Fraunhofer lines, spectral lines of the Sun
- Fraunhofer distance, between near field and far field
