= August Ludwig Busch =

- Born: September 7, 1804; West Prussia, Danzig
- Died: September 30, 1855 (aged 51); Königsberg,
- Scientific career
- Fields: Astronomy

August Ludwig Busch (7 September 1804 – 30 September 1855) was a German astronomer who served as an assistant to Friedrich Bessel and from 1846, headed the Königsberg observatory.

Busch was born in Danzig where he went to school and trained in art under Johann Adam Breysig who made him interested in geometry. He then learned some mathematics through private tutors. He then worked as a tutor for the children of Joseph von Eichendorff, President of the council for West Prussia from 1824. Eichendorff moved from Danzig to Königsberg, Busch also moved and began to attend the lectures of Friedrich Wilhelm Bessel. Bessel employed him as an assistant from 1831 at the Königsberg observatory, succeeding Carl Theodor Anger. When Bessel died in 1846, Carl Gustav Jacob Jacobi proposed that the Busch be made in-charge of the observatory. Busch continued observations relating to polar motion that Bessel had begun. He also observed solar eclipses and had one of the first successful daguerreotype photographs taken of a total solar eclipse in 1851. The photograph itself had been taken by Julius Berkowski at the instance of Busch. He reduced a series of long-term observations made by James Bradley in England from 1727 to 1747 to obtain constants relating to nutation. For this work, he was awarded a prize by the Danish Royal Society of Sciences. Jacobi edited and posthumously republished a textbook on geometry by Busch in 1868 - Vorschule der darstellenden Geometrie, the first edition of which came out in 1846.

Busch died from cholera in Königsberg.
