= Bessell =

Bessell is a surname. Notable people with the surname include:

- Alfred Bessell-Browne (1877–1947), Australian Army colonel and temporary Brigadier-General in World War I
- Eric Bessell (1923–1979), Australian politician
- Peter Bessell (1921–1985), British politician
- Ted Bessell (1935–1996), American television actor

== See also ==
- Bessel (disambiguation)
