= Personal equation =

Idea that observers have different reaction times

The term personal equation, in 19th- and early 20th-century science, referred to the idea that different observers have different reaction times, which can introduce bias when it comes to measurements and observations. Simon Schaffer wrote it "was the name given by astronomers after Bessel to the differences in measured transit times recorded by observers in the same situation".

== Astronomy ==
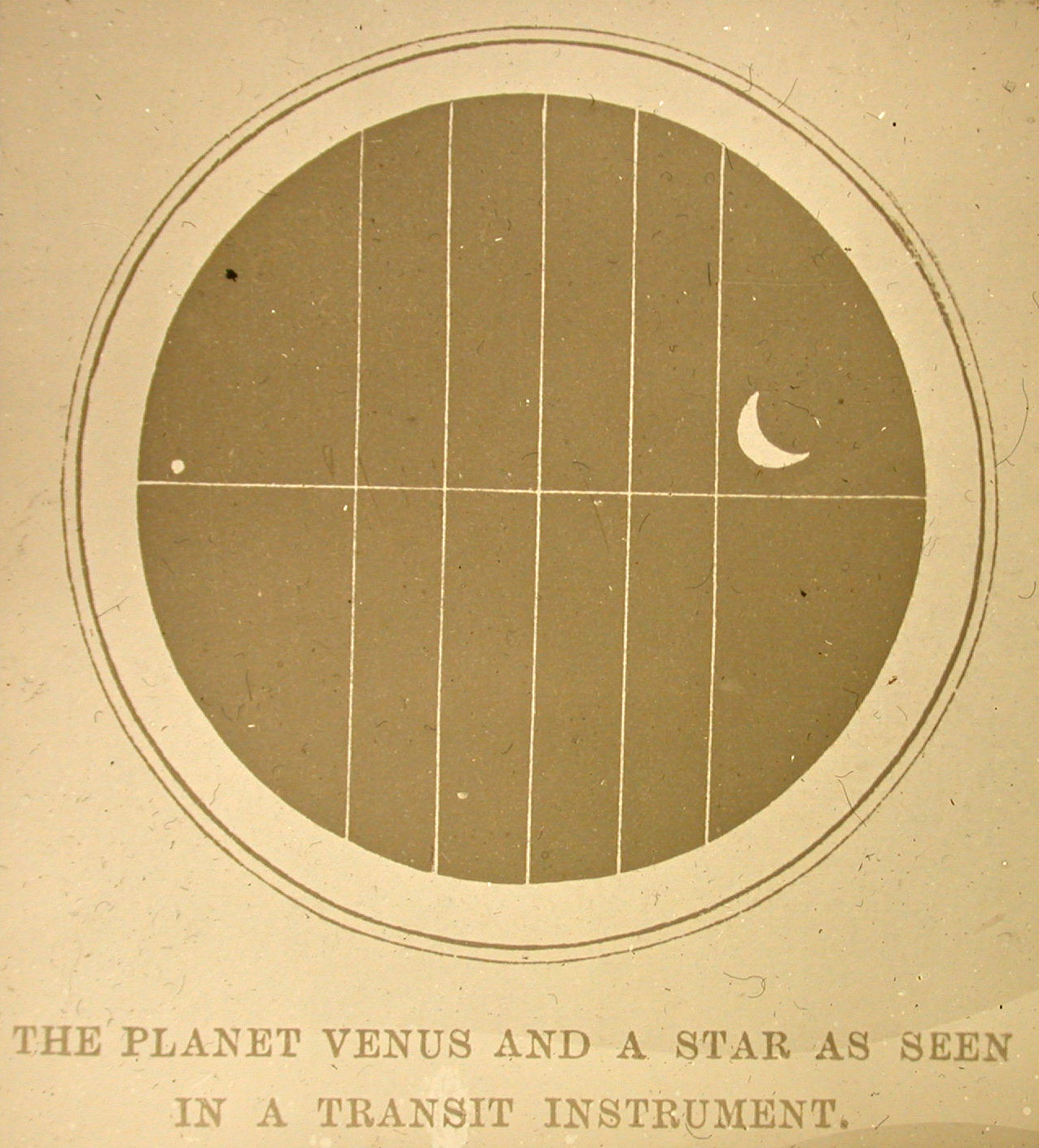
The view of the reticle in a transit instrument.

The term originated in astronomy, when it was discovered that numerous observers making simultaneous observations would record slightly different values (for example, in recording the exact time at which a star crossed the wires of a reticule in a telescope), some of which were of a significant enough difference to afford for problems in larger calculations. The existence of the effect was first discovered when, in 1796, the Astronomer Royal Neville Maskelyne dismissed his assistant Kinnebrooke because he could not better the error of his observations relative to Maskelyne's own values. The problem was forgotten and only analysed two decades later by Friedrich Wilhelm Bessel at Königsberg Observatory in Prussia. Setting up an experiment to compare the values, Bessel and an assistant measured the times at which several stars crossed the wires of a reticule in different nights. Compared to his assistant, Bessel found himself to be ahead by more than a second.

In response to this realization, astronomers became increasingly suspicious of the results of other astronomers and their own assistants and began systematic programs to attempt to find ways to remove or lessen the effects. These included attempts at the automation of observations (appealing to the presumed objectivity of machines), training observers to try to avoid certain known errors (such as those caused by lack of sleep), developing machines that could allow multiple observers to make observations at the same time, the taking of redundant data and using techniques such as the method of least squares to derive possible values from them, and trying to quantify the biases of individual workers so that they could be subtracted from the data. It became a major topic in experimental psychology as well, and was a major motivation for developing methods to deal with error in astronomy.

== James and Jung ==
William James helped move the concept of the personal equation from astronomy to social science, arguing that theoretical preconceptions and personal knowledge could lead investigators to wild interpretations based largely on their own personal equations.

Carl Jung took up the idea in his book Psychological Types, arguing that in psychology "one sees what one can best see oneself". He continued to wrestle in later writings with the problems of psychological solipsism and infinite regress this potentially posed, and considered every therapist should have at least a good working knowledge of his or her own personal equation.

== See also ==
- Source criticism
- Theory‐ladenness of observations
