= Sarabhai (crater) =

Crater on the Moon

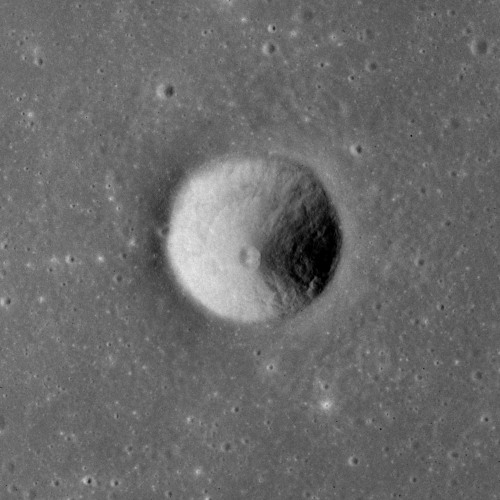
- Apollo 15 image
- Coordinates: 24.7°N 21.0°E
- Diameter: 8 km
- Depth: 1.36 km
- Colongitude: 339° at sunrise
- Eponym: Vikram A. Sarabhai

Sarabhai is a circular, bowl-shaped crater on the Mare Serenitatis, in the northeast quadrant of the Moon. On the lunar geologic timescale, this formation dates to the Eratosthenian period. The formation is relatively isolated, being located to the northeast of the crater Bessel. It lies along a wrinkle ridge designated the Dorsum Azara.

The crater was named after Indian astrophysicist Vikram Sarabhai in 1973, considered the Father of the Indian Space Programme. It was previously identified as Bessel A.
