= Friedrich Wilhelm Bessel =

German astronomer and mathematician (1784–1846)

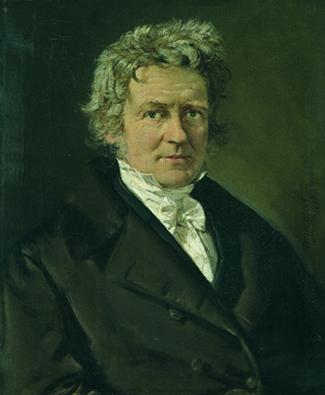
- C. A. Jensen, Friedrich Wilhelm Bessel, 1839 (Ny Carlsberg Glyptotek)
- Born: 22 July 1784; Minden, Kingdom of Prussia, Holy Roman Empire
- Died: 17 March 1846 (aged 61); Königsberg, Kingdom of Prussia
- Known for: Bessel functions Bessel ellipsoid Bessel polynomials Besselian elements Bessel's correction Bessel's inequality Repsold–Bessel pendulum
- Awards: PhD (Hon); University of Göttingen (1811); Lalande Prize (1811), (1816); Gold Medal of the Royal Astronomical Society (1829 and 1841)
- Scientific career
- Fields: Astronomy, mathematics, geodesy
- Workplaces: University of Königsberg
- Doctoral students: Friedrich Wilhelm Argelander Heinrich Scherk

Friedrich Wilhelm Bessel (German: [ˈbɛsl̩]; 22 July 1784 – 17 March 1846) was a German astronomer, mathematician, physicist, and geodesist. He was the first astronomer who determined reliable values for the distance from the Sun to another star by the method of parallax. Certain important mathematical functions were first studied systematically by Bessel and were named Bessel functions in his honour.

== Life and family ==
Bessel was born in Minden, Westphalia, then capital of the Prussian administrative region Minden-Ravensberg, as second son of a civil servant into a large family. At the age of 14 he left the school, because he did not like the education in Latin language, and apprenticed in the import-export concern Kulenkamp at Bremen. The business's reliance on cargo ships led him to turn his mathematical skills to problems in navigation. This in turn led to an interest in astronomy as a way of determining longitude.

Bessel came to the attention of Heinrich Wilhelm Olbers, a practising physician of Bremen and well-known astronomer, by producing a refinement on the orbital calculations for Halley's Comet in 1804, using old observation data taken from Thomas Harriot and Nathaniel Torporley in 1607. Franz Xaver von Zach edited the results in his journal Monatliche Correspondenz.

Having finished his commercial education, Bessel left Kulenkamp in 1806 and became assistant at Johann Hieronymus Schröter's private observatory in Lilienthal near Bremen as successor of Karl Ludwig Harding. There he worked on James Bradley's stellar observation data to produce precise positions for some 3,222 stars.

Despite lacking any higher education, especially at university, Bessel was appointed director of the newly founded Königsberg Observatory by King Frederick William III of Prussia in January 1810, at the age of 25, and remained in that position until his death. Some elder professors of the Philosophical Faculty disputed Bessel's right to teach mathematics without any academic degree. Therefore, he turned to his fellow Carl Friedrich Gauss, who provided the award of an honorary doctor degree from the University of Göttingen in March 1811. Both scientists were in correspondence from 1804 to 1843. In 1837 they got in quarrel about Gauss's habit of very slow publication.

In 1842 Bessel took part in the annual meeting of the British Association for the Advancement of Science in Manchester, accompanied by the geophysicist Georg Adolf Erman and the mathematician Carl Gustav Jacob Jacobi, where he gave a report on astronomical clocks.

Bessel married Johanna Hagen, the daughter of the chemist and pharmacist Karl Gottfried Hagen who was the uncle of the physician and biologist Hermann August Hagen and the hydraulic engineer Gotthilf Hagen, the latter also Bessel's student and assistant from 1816 to 1818. The physicist Franz Ernst Neumann, Bessel's close companion and colleague, was married to Johanna Hagen's sister Florentine. Neumann introduced Bessel's exacting methods of measurement and data reduction into his mathematico-physical seminar, which he co-directed with Carl Gustav Jacob Jacobi at Königsberg. These exacting methods had a lasting impact upon the work of Neumann's students and upon the Prussian conception of precision in measurement.

Bessel had two sons and three daughters. His elder son became an architect but died suddenly in 1840 aged 26; his younger son died shortly after birth. His eldest daughter, Marie, married the physicist Georg Adolf Erman, member of the scholar family Erman. One of their sons in turn was the renowned Egyptologist Adolf Erman. His third daughter Johanna married the politician Adolf Hermann Hagen; one of their sons was the physicist Ernst Bessel Hagen, and the mathematician Erich Bessel-Hagen was their grandson. Bessel was godfather of Adolf von Baeyer, son of his collaborator Johann Jacob Baeyer.

After several months of illness Bessel died in March 1846 at his observatory from retroperitoneal fibrosis.

== Work ==
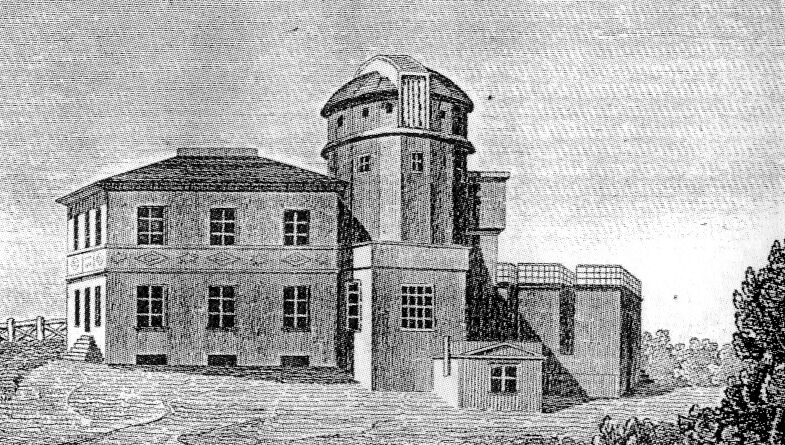
Königsberg Observatory (1830)

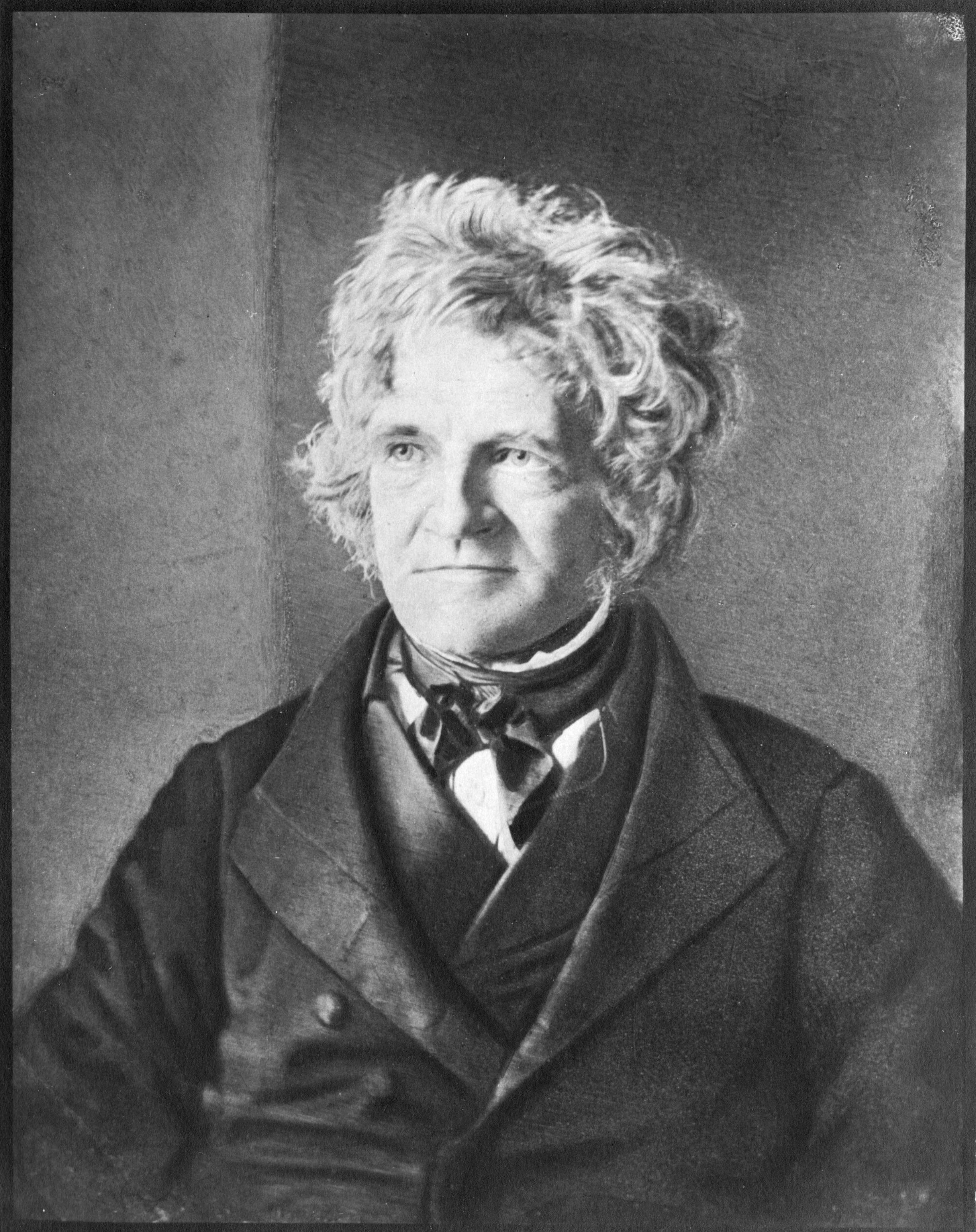
Daguerreotype (1843)

While the observatory was still in construction Bessel elaborated the Fundamenta Astronomiae based on Bradley's observations. As a preliminary result he produced tables of atmospheric refraction that won him the Lalande Prize from the French Academy of Sciences in 1811. The Königsberg Observatory began operation in 1813.

Starting in 1819, Bessel determined the position of over 50,000 stars with a meridian circle from Reichenbach, assisted by some of his qualified students. The most prominent of them was Friedrich Wilhelm Argelander, his successors were Otto August Rosenberger and August Ludwig Busch.

Bessel determined the first reliable value for the distance between a star and the Solar System with a heliometer from Fraunhofer using the method of stellar parallax. In 1838 he published a parallax of 0.314 arcseconds for 61 Cygni, which indicated that the star is 10.3 ly away. Compared with the current measurement of 11.4 ly, Bessel's figure had an error of 9.6%. Thanks to these results astronomers had not only enlarged the vision of the universe well beyond the cosmic magnitude, but after the discovery in 1728 by James Bradley of the aberration of light a second empirical evidence of the Earth's relative movement was produced. A short time later Friedrich Georg Wilhelm Struve and Thomas Henderson reported the parallaxes of Vega and Alpha Centauri.

Precise measurements with a new meridian circle from Adolf Repsold allowed Bessel to notice deviations in the motions of Sirius and Procyon, which must be caused by the gravitational attraction of unseen companions. His announcement of Sirius's "dark companion" in 1844 was the first correct claim of a previously unobserved companion by positional measurement, and eventually led to the discovery of Sirius B by Alvan Graham Clark in 1862, the first discovery of a white dwarf. John Martin Schaeberle discovered Procyon B in 1896.

Bessel was the first scientist who realized the effect later called personal equation, that several simultaneously observing persons determine slightly different values, especially recording the transit time of stars.

In 1824, Bessel developed a new method for calculating the circumstances of eclipses using the so-called Besselian elements. His method simplified the calculation to such an extent, without sacrificing accuracy, that it is still in use.

On Bessel's proposal the Prussian Academy of Sciences started the edition of the Berliner Akademische Sternkarten (Berlin Academic Star Charts) in 1825 as an international project with Johann Franz Encke as executive editor. One unpublished new chart enabled Johann Gottfried Galle to find Neptune near the position calculated by Le Verrier in September 1846 at Berlin Observatory.

In the 18th century a series of cylinder functions were introduced to solve string vibration problems by Daniel Bernoulli, Leonhard Euler and others. These functions were used by Joseph-Louis Lagrange and Bessel to solve the Kepler's equation. Bessel later systematically studied the mathematical properties of these functions, now known as Bessel functions. These functions are critical for the solution of certain differential equations, these functions are used throughout both classical and quantum physics. In his studies of this functions, Bessel published for the first time the Fourier series, before Joseph Fourier who had worked on it but his work was published decades later.

A correction term in the formula for the sample variance estimator is named in his honour. This is the use of the factor n − 1 in the denominator of the formula, rather than just n. This occurs when the sample mean rather than the population mean is used to centre the data and since the sample mean is a linear combination of the data the residual to the sample mean overcounts the number of degrees of freedom by the number of constraint equations — in this case one.

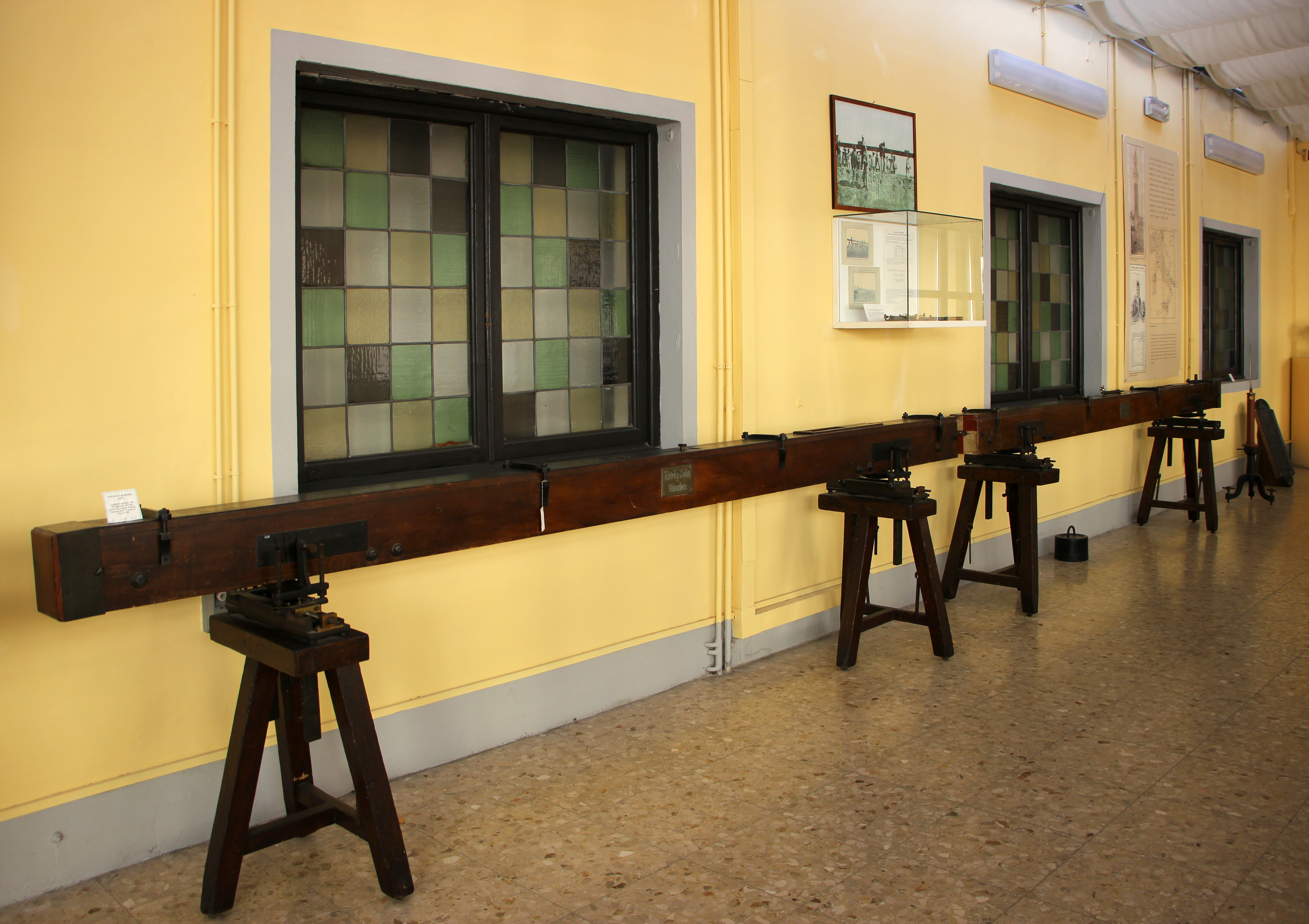
Bessel's geodetic apparatus, in the museum of Istituto Geografico Militare, Florence, Italy

Like numerous astronomers of his time Bessel dealt on the field of geodesy, too, first theoretically, when he published a method for solving the main geodetic problem. In 1830 he got the royal order for the survey of East Prussia with the purpose to connect the yet existing Prussian and Russian triangulation networks. This work was carried out in cooperation with Johann Jacob Baeyer, then major of the Prussian army; the final report was published in 1838. He also obtained an estimate of increased accuracy for the Earth's ellipsoid, nowadays called the Bessel ellipsoid, based on several arc measurements.

== Honors and prizes ==
- Honorary doctor degree from the University of Göttingen in March 1811
- Lalande Prize of the French Academy of Sciences in 1811 and 1816
- Member of the Prussian Academy of Sciences in 1812
- Member of the French Academy of Sciences in 1816
- Foreign member of the Royal Swedish Academy of Sciences in 1823
- Fellow of the Royal Society in 1825
- Foreign Honorary Member of the American Academy of Arts and Sciences in 1832
- Member of the Royal Institute of the Netherlands, predecessor of the Royal Netherlands Academy of Arts and Sciences in 1827
- Member of the American Philosophical Society in 1840
- Member of the National Academy of Science in Verona (1842),
- Bessel won the Gold Medal of the Royal Astronomical Society twice, in 1829 and 1841

Bessel was one of the first members of the Order Pour le Merite (Civil class) when it was established in 1842.

The first cosmic object named after Bessel is the largest crater in the Moon's Mare Serenitatis. The main-belt asteroid 1552 Bessel was named at the centenary of the parallax determination in 1938.

Geographical commemorations are two fjords in Greenland, Bessel Fjord, NE Greenland and Bessel Fjord, NW Greenland.

Xyletinus besseli a fossil beetle from the Eocene belonging to the family Ptinidae, found in the Baltic amber in Sambia, was named in his honour.

BeSSel, the Bar and Spiral Structure Legacy Survey, is named after him.

== Publications ==
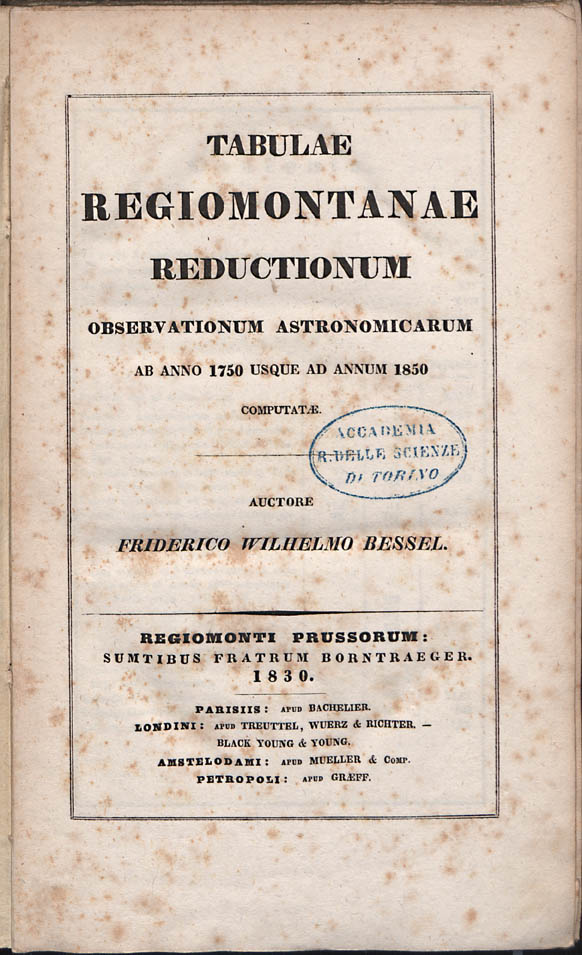
Tabulae Regiomontanae reductionum observationum astronomicarum ab anno 1750 usque ad annum 1850 computatae, 1830

Latin

- Fundamenta Astronomiae pro anno MDCCLV deducta ex observationibus viri incomparabilis James Bradley in specula astronomica Grenovicensi, per annos 1750–1762 institutis. Königsberg: Friedr. Nicolovius. 1818.
- Tabulae Regiomontanae reductionum observationum astronomicarum ab anno 1750 usque ad annum 1850 computatae. Saint Petersburg: Brüder Borntraeger. 1830.

German

- Untersuchungen über die scheinbare und wahre Bahn des im Jahre 1807 erschienenen grossen Kometen. [Investigations on the apparent and the real orbit of the great comet of 1807], Königsberg, 1810
- Untersuchung der Größe und des Einflusses des Vorrückens der Nachtgleichen. [Investigations on precession], Berlin, 1815
- Untersuchungen über die Länge des einfachen Secundenpendels. [Investigations on the length of the seconds pendulum], Berlin, 1828
- Versuche über die Kraft mit welcher die Erde Körper von verschiedener Beschaffenheit anzieht. [Experiments on the force with which the Earth attracts things of different matter], Berlin, 1832
- Bessel, Friedrich Wilhelm; Baeyer, Johann Jacob (1838), Gradmessung in Ostpreußen und ihre Verbindung mit Preußischen und Russischen Dreiecksketten. [The East Prussian Survey and its connection with the Prussian and Russian networks], Berlin, Bibcode:1838goiv.book.....B
- Darstellung der Untersuchungen und Maaßregeln, welche, in 1835 bis 1838, durch die Einheit des Preußischen Längenmaaßes veranlaßt worden sind. [Description of the investigations and rules arranged in 1835 to 1838 for the standardization of the Prussian unit of length], Berlin, 1839
- Astronomische Beobachtungen auf der Königlichen Universitäts-Sternwarte zu Königsberg. [Astronomical Observations (XXI Volumes)], Königsberg, 1815–1844
- Astronomische Untersuchungen. [Astronomical Investigations. (2 Volumes)], Königsberg, 1841–1842
- Heinrich Christian Schumacher, ed. (1848), Populäre Vorlesungen über wissenschaftliche Gegenstände von F.W.Bessel. [Popular lectures on scientific subjects], Hamburg
- Rudolf Engelmann (ed.), Abhandlungen von Friedrich Wilhelm Bessel. [Treatises of Friedrich Wilhelm Bessel]
  - Vol. 1: I. Bewegungen der Körper im Sonnensystem. II. Sphärische Astronomie. Leipzig 1875
  - Vol. 2: III. Theorie der Instrumente. IV. Stellarastronomie. V. Mathematik. Leipzig 1876
  - Vol. 3: VI. Geodäsie. VII. Physik. VIII. Verschiedenes – Literatur. Leipzig 1876.
- Rudolf Engelmann, ed. (1878), Recensionen von Friedrich Wilhelm Bessel, Leipzig: Kessinger Publishing

Correspondence

- Königlich Preußische Akademie der Wissenschaften, ed. (1880): Briefwechsel zwischen Gauss und Bessel. [Correspondence] Leipzig.

== See also ==
- List of things named after Friedrich Bessel
