= Koenigsberg Observatory =

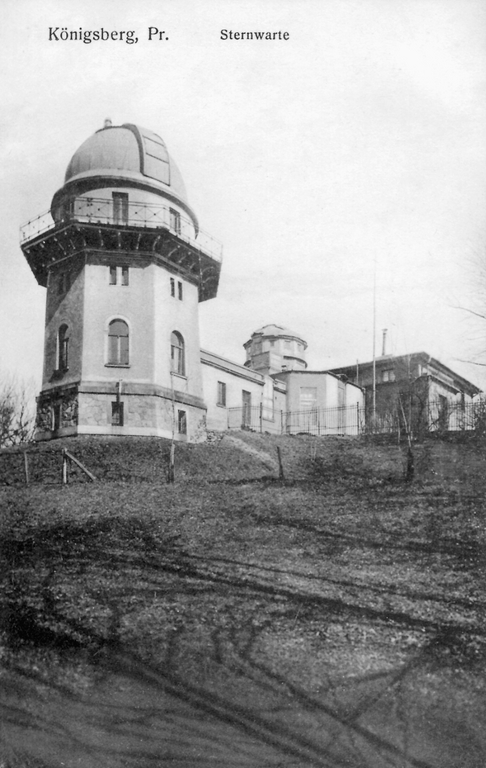
- Koenigsberg Observatory
- Observatory code: 058
- Location: Königsberg, Kaliningrad Oblast, Kingdom of Prussia, Nazi Germany
- Coordinates: 54°42′47″N 20°29′40″E
- Related media on Commons

Koenigsberg Observatory (German: Sternwarte Königsberg; Königsberger Universitätssternwarte; obs. code: 058) was an astronomical observatory and research facility which was attached to the Albertina University in Königsberg, what is now Kaliningrad, Russia. The observatory was destroyed by Royal Air Force bombs in August 1944 during the Second World War.

Only the reduit (interior of the building) remained from the bastion. The building is a semicircular two-storey building with a brick vault. Nowadays, the building is considered a regional architectural monument.

== Description ==
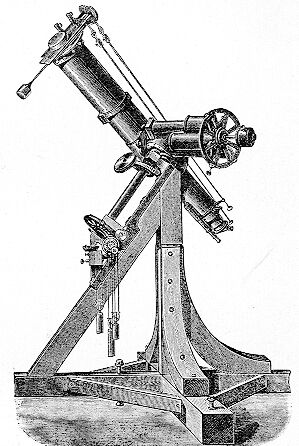
Fraunhofer's heliometer

It was founded in 1810 and started working in 1813. Well-known astronomers who used the observatory included Friedrich Wilhelm Bessel, Friedrich Wilhelm Argelander, Arthur Auwers and Hermann Struve. In 1838, the parallax of a star was determined successfully for first time by Bessel using a heliometer of Fraunhofer.

== Gallery ==
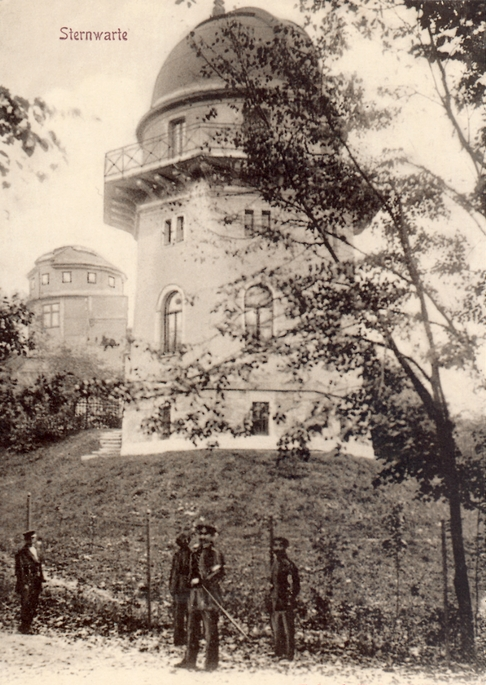
Koenigsberg Observatory

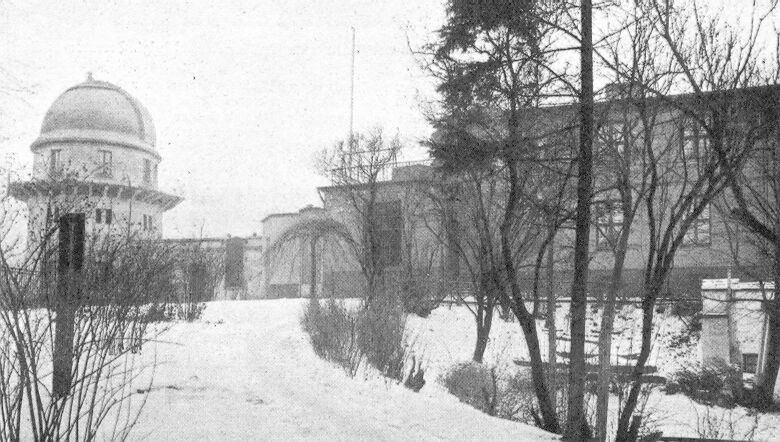
Observatory (unknown date)

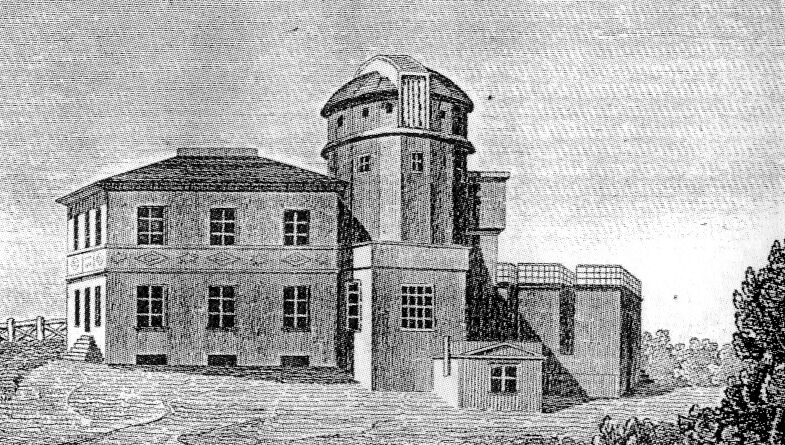
Observatory in 1830

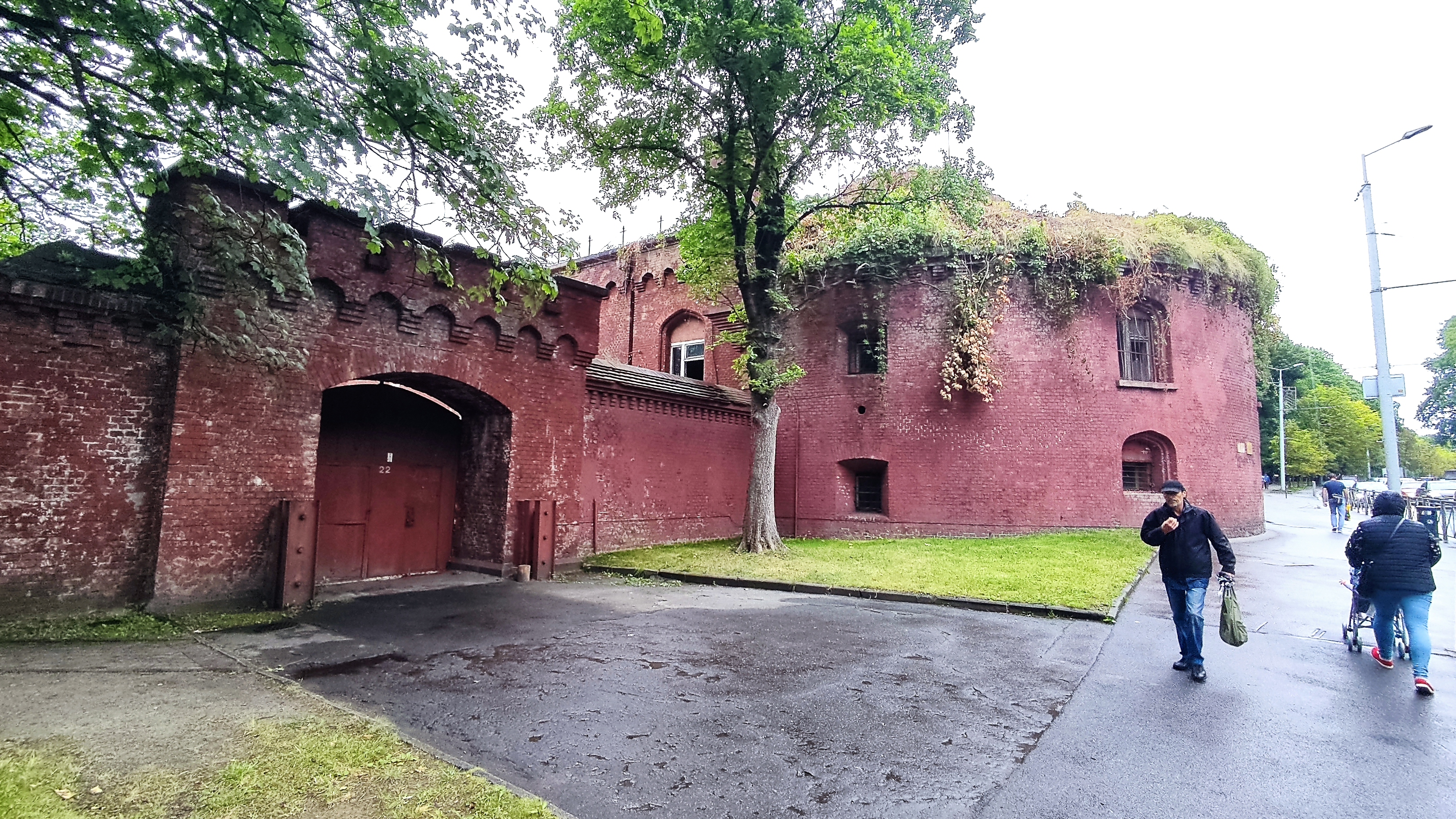
Ruins of observatory in 2021
