= Besselian elements =

Set of values to predict occultations

Outline of umbra and penumbra (green) during total solar eclipse on Earth's surface and in fundamental plane (red)

The Besselian elements are a set of values used to calculate and predict the local circumstances of occultations for an observer on Earth. This method is particularly used for solar eclipses, but is also applied for occultations of stars or planets by the Moon and transits of Venus or Mercury. In addition, for lunar eclipses a similar method is used, in which the shadow is cast on the Moon instead of the Earth.

For solar eclipses, the Besselian elements are used to calculate the path of the umbra and penumbra on the Earth's surface, and hence the circumstances of the eclipse at a specific location. This method was developed in the 1820s by the German mathematician and astronomer, Friedrich Bessel, and later improved by William Chauvenet.

The basic concept is that Besselian elements describe the movement of the shadow cast by the occulting body – for solar eclipses this is the shadow of the Moon – on a specifically chosen plane, called the fundamental plane. This is the geocentric, normal plane of the shadow axis. In other words, it is the plane through the Earth's center that is perpendicular to the line through the centers of the occulting and the occulted bodies. One advantage, among others, of choosing this plane is that the outline of the shadow on it is always a circle, and there is no perspective distortion.

Comparatively few values are needed to accurately describe the movement of the shadow on the fundamental plane. Based on this, the next step is to project the shadow cone on to the Earth's surface, taking into account the figure of the Earth, its rotation, and the observer's latitude, longitude and elevation.

Although the Besselian elements determine the overall geometry of an eclipse, which longitudes on the Earth's surface will experience an eclipse are determined by the Earth's rotation. A variable called ΔT measures how much that rotation has slowed over time and must also be taken into account when predicting local eclipse circumstances.
