= Heliometer =

Astronomical measuring instrument

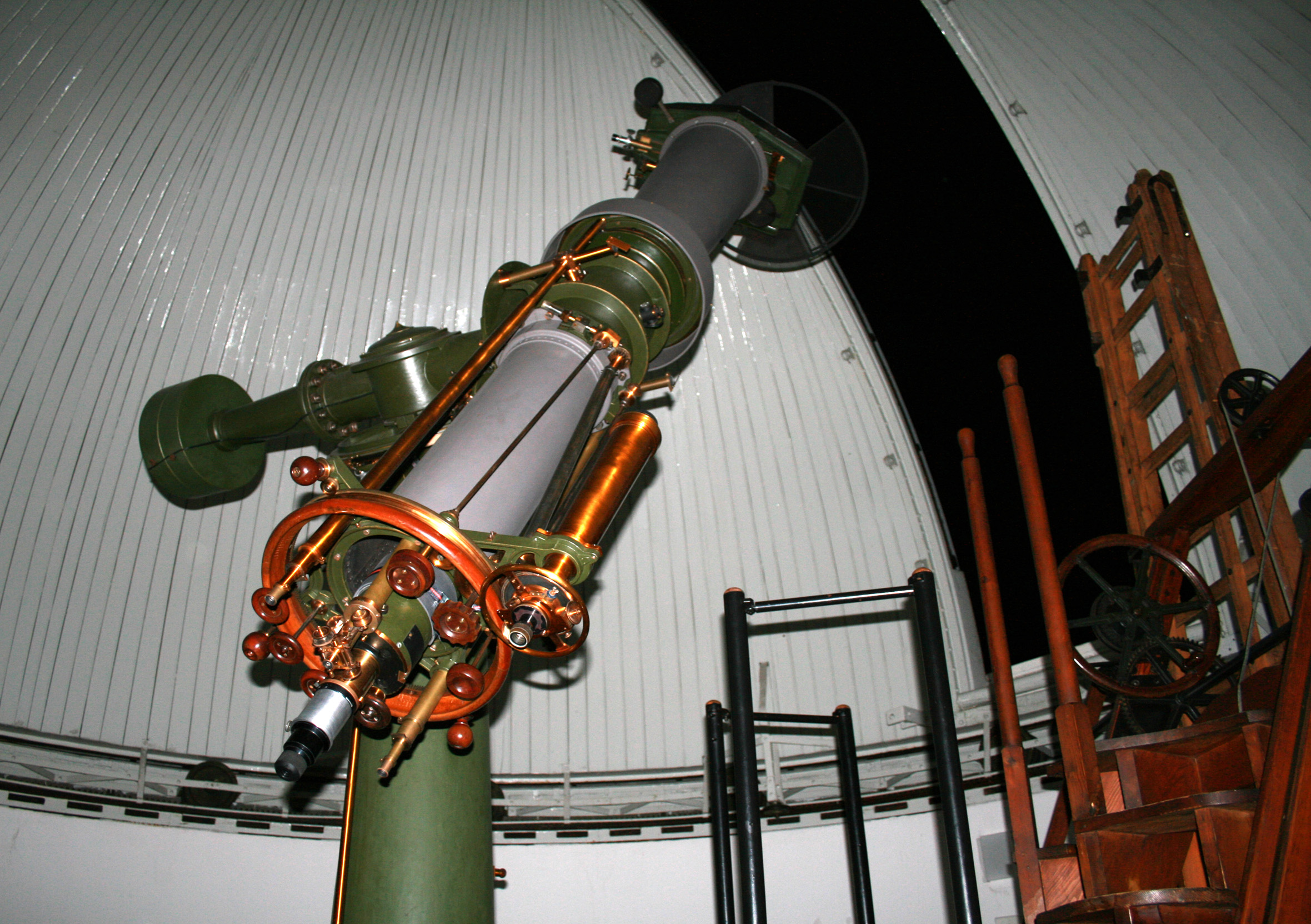
Heliometer at the Kuffner observatory (Vienna, Austria)

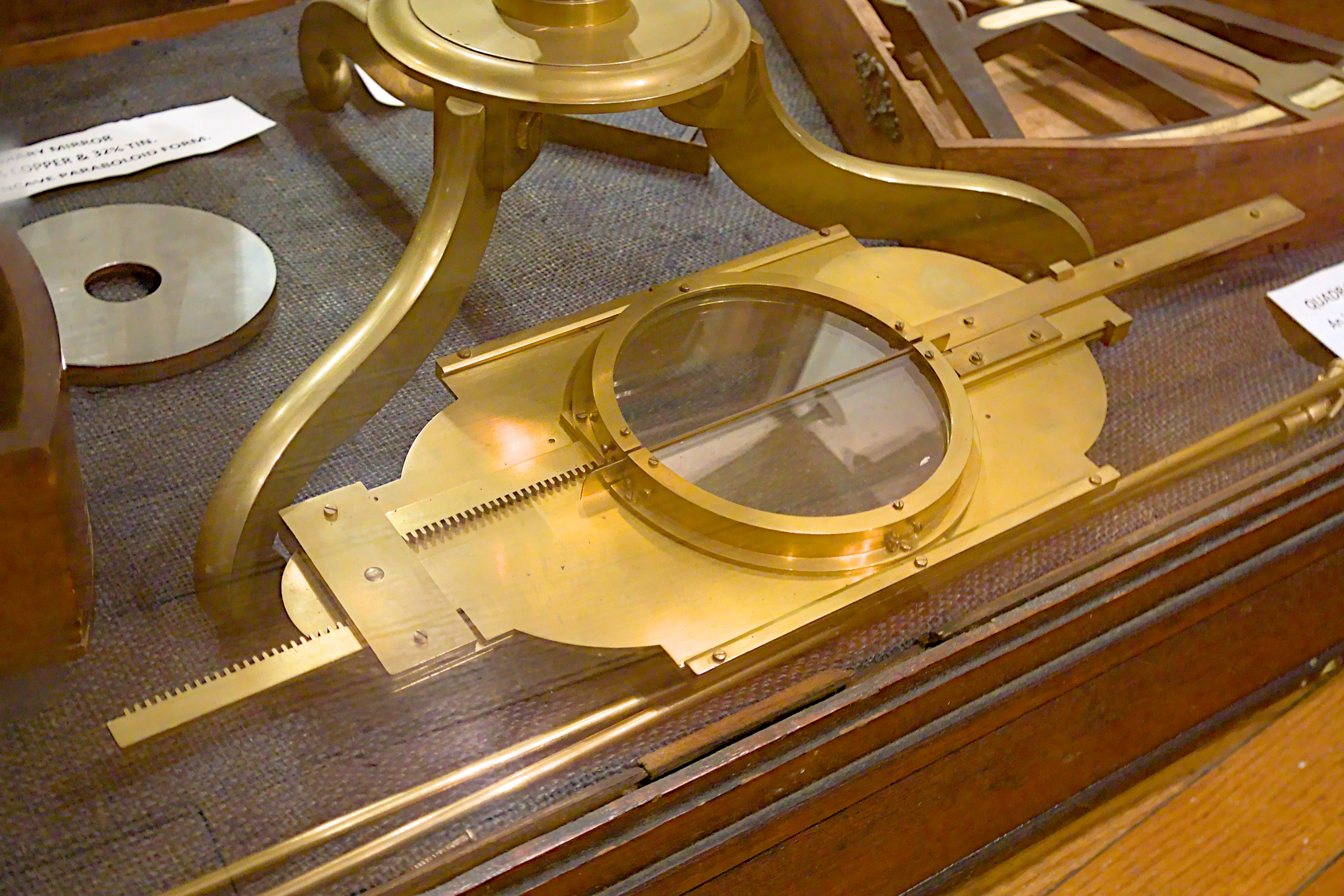
Heliometer split lens, displayed at Custer Observatory, Long Island, New York.

A heliometer (from Greek ἥλιος 'sun' and 'measure') is an instrument originally developed from the mid-eighteenth to early nineteenth centuries for measuring the variation of the Sun's diameter at different seasons of the year, but the modern version of the instrument is capable of much wider use.

== Description ==
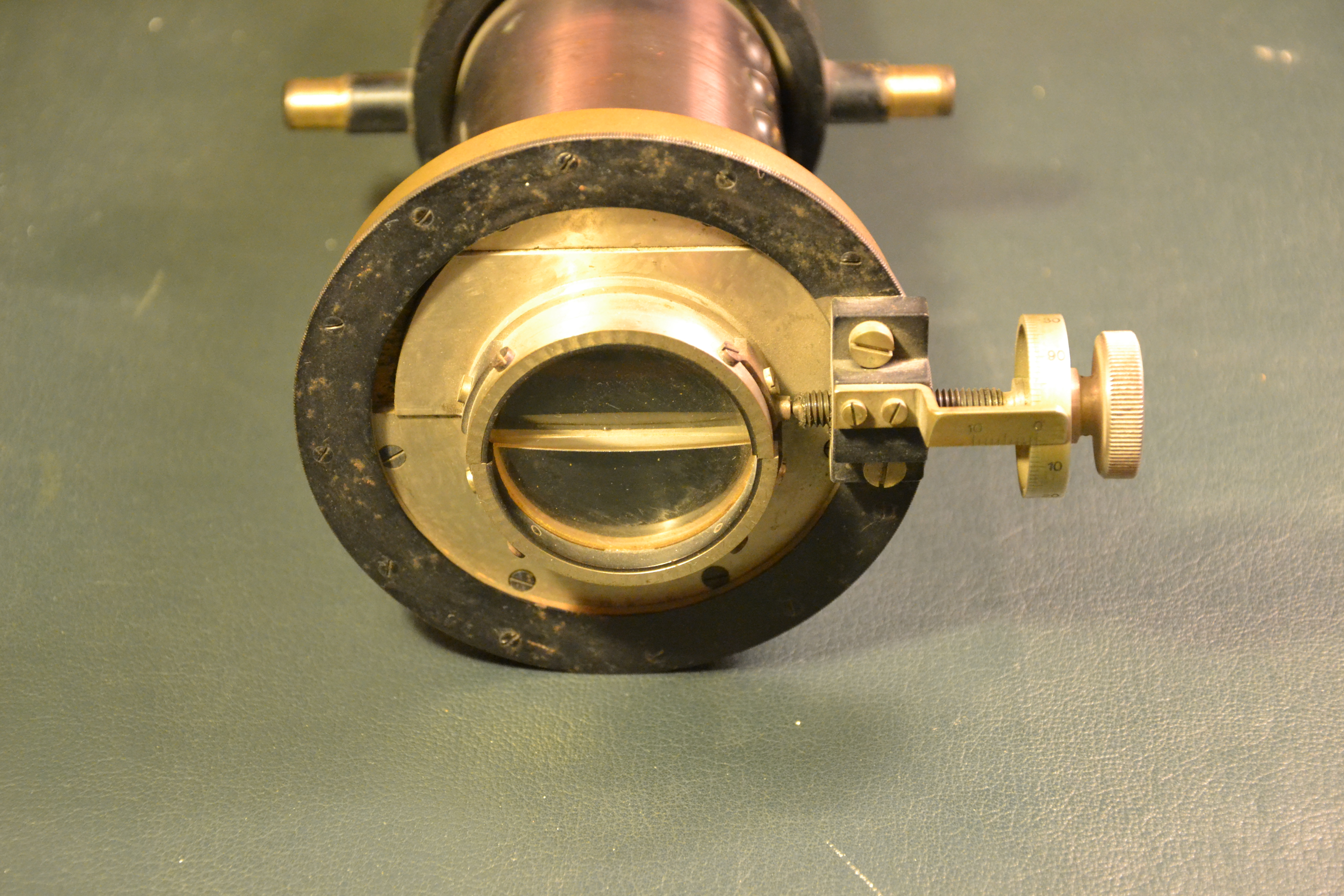
Heliometer by Carl Bamberg, Berlin, around 1880/1890. Diameter of the lens 4.2 cm.

Double image of the solar disk

The basic concept is to introduce a split element into a telescope's optical path so as to produce a double image. If one element is moved using a screw micrometer, precise angle measurements can be made. The simplest arrangement is to split the object lens in half, with one half fixed and the other attached to the micrometer screw and slid along the cut diameter. To measure the diameter of the Sun, for example, the micrometer is first adjusted so that the two images of the solar disk coincide (the "zero" position where the split elements form essentially a single element). The micrometer is then adjusted so that diametrically opposite sides of the two images of the solar disk just touch each other. The difference in the two micrometer readings so obtained is the (angular) diameter of the Sun. Similarly, a precise measurement of the apparent separation between two nearby stars, A and B, is made by first superimposing the two images of the stars and then adjusting the double image so that star A in one image coincides with star B in the other. The difference in the two micrometer readings so obtained is the apparent separation or angular distance between the two stars.

== History ==
The Syrian Arab astronomer Mu'ayyad al-Din al-Urdi, in his book, described a device called "the instrument with the two holes," which he used to measure and observe the apparent diameters of the Sun and the Moon.

The first application of the divided object-glass and the employment of double images in astronomical measures is due to Servington Savery of Shilstone in 1743. Pierre Bouguer, in 1748, originated the true conception of measurement by double image without the auxiliary aid of a filar micrometer, that is by changing the distance between two object-glasses of equal focus.

John Dollond, in 1754, combined Savary's idea of the divided object-glass with Bouguer's method of measurement, resulting in the construction of the first really practical heliometers. As far as can be determined, Joseph von Fraunhofer, some time not long before 1820, constructed the first heliometer with an achromatic divided object-glass, i.e. the first heliometer of the modern type. The first successful measurements of stellar parallax (to determine the distance to a star) were made by Friedrich Wilhelm Bessel in 1838 for the star 61 Cygni using a Fraunhofer heliometer. This was the 6.2-inch (157.5 mm) aperture Fraunhofer heliometer at Königsberg Observatory built by Joseph von Fraunhofer's firm, though he did not live to see it delivered to Bessel. Although the heliometer was difficult to use, it had certain advantages for Bessel including a wider field of view compared to other great refractors of the period, and overcame atmospheric turbulence in measurements compared to a filar micrometer.

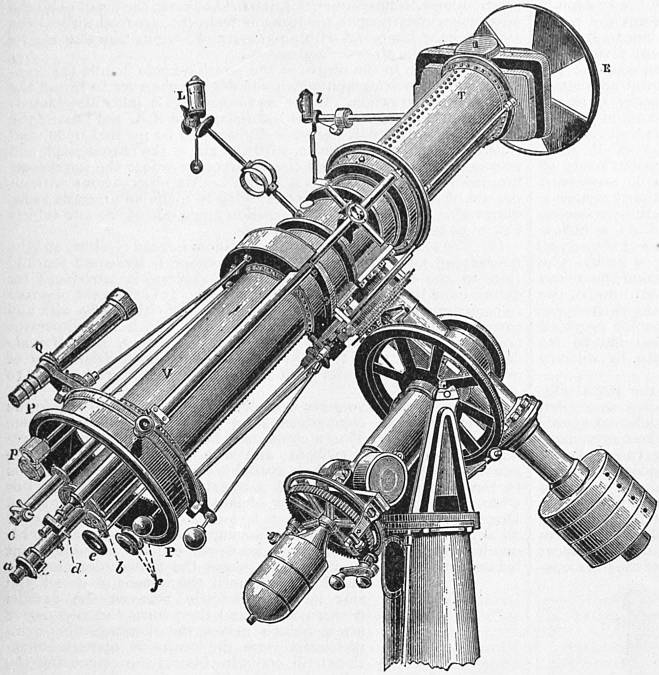
Heliometer at Yale College, New Haven, US: c. 1910, built by Repsolds
