= 1552 Bessel =

Main-belt asteroid

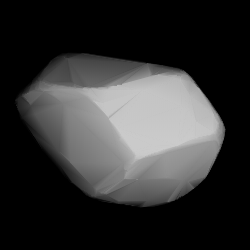
- Shape model of Bessel from its lightcurve

Discovery
- Discovered by: Y. Väisälä
- Discovery site: Turku Observatory
- Discovery date: 24 February 1938

Designations
- Named after: Friedrich Bessel (German astronomer)
- Alternative designations: 1938 DE_{1} · 1933 FJ_{1} 1948 EH · 1951 UF
- Minor planet category: main-belt · Eos

Orbital characteristics
- Epoch 4 September 2017 (JD 2458000.5)
- Uncertainty parameter 0
- Observation arc: 84.11 yr (30,722 days)
- Aphelion: 3.3068 AU
- Perihelion: 2.7174 AU
- Semi-major axis: 3.0121 AU
- Eccentricity: 0.0978
- Orbital period (sidereal): 5.23 yr (1,909 days)
- Mean anomaly: 185.26°
- Mean motion: 0° 11^{m} 18.6^{s} / day
- Inclination: 9.8367°
- Longitude of ascending node: 9.9835°
- Argument of perihelion: 39.607°

Physical characteristics
- Dimensions: 16.63±0.84 km 18.33 km (derived); 18.514±0.066 km 18.817±0.101 km
- Synodic rotation period: 8.96318±0.00002 h (Note: Hanus (2016) web: rotation period of 8.96318 hours. (λ, β)-Pole axis of (61.0°, −50.0°) and (221.0°, −57.0°) . Summary figures at Collaborative Asteroid Lightcurve Link (CALL) for (1552) Bessel); 8.996±0.006 h
- Geometric albedo: 0.1448 (derived); 0.1514±0.0332; 0.156±0.023; 0.193±0.024
- Spectral type: S
- Absolute magnitude (H): 11.3 · 11.4 · 11.53±0.24

1552 Bessel (provisional designation 1938 DE_{1}) is a stony Eoan asteroid from the outer regions of the asteroid belt, approximately 18 kilometers in diameter. It was discovered on 24 February 1938, by Finnish astronomer Yrjö Väisälä at Turku Observatory in Southwest Finland, and named after German astronomer Friedrich Bessel.

== Orbit and classification ==
Bessel is a stony asteroid and a member of the Eos family that orbits the Sun in the outer main-belt at a distance of 2.7–3.3 AU once every 5 years and 3 months (1,909 days). Its orbit has an eccentricity of 0.10 and an inclination of 10° with respect to the ecliptic. First observed as 1933 FJ_{1} at Heidelberg in 1933, the body's observation arc begins at Turku, 5 days prior to its official discovery observation.

== Naming ==
This minor planet was named after German astronomer Friedrich Wilhelm Bessel (1789–1846), who measured the first stellar parallax in 1838. His measured parallax of 0.314 arcseconds for 61 Cygni gave a distance of 10.3 light-years, which is 9.6% off today's measured distance of 11.4 light-years. Bessel is also honored by the lunar crater Bessel. The official naming citation was published by the Minor Planet Center on 30 January 1964 (M.P.C. 2278).

== Physical characteristics ==
=== Rotation period and pole ===
In March 2011, a rotational lightcurve of Bessel was obtained from photometric observations by Italian amateur astronomer Silvano Casulli. Lightcurve analysis gave a well-defined rotation period of 8.996 hours with a brightness variation of 0.29 magnitude (U=3).

In 2016, a modeled lightcurve using photometric data from various sources gave a concurring period of 8.96318 hours, as well as a spin axis of (61.0°, −50.0°) in ecliptic coordinates (λ, β).

=== Diameter and albedo ===
According to the survey carried out by NASA's Wide-field Infrared Survey Explorer with its subsequent NEOWISE mission, Bessel measures between 16.63 and 18.817 kilometers in diameter, and its surface has an albedo between 0.1514 and 0.193. The Collaborative Asteroid Lightcurve Link derives an albedo of 0.1448 and a diameter of 18.33 kilometers with an absolute magnitude of 11.4.
