= MV Bessel =

German cargo ship

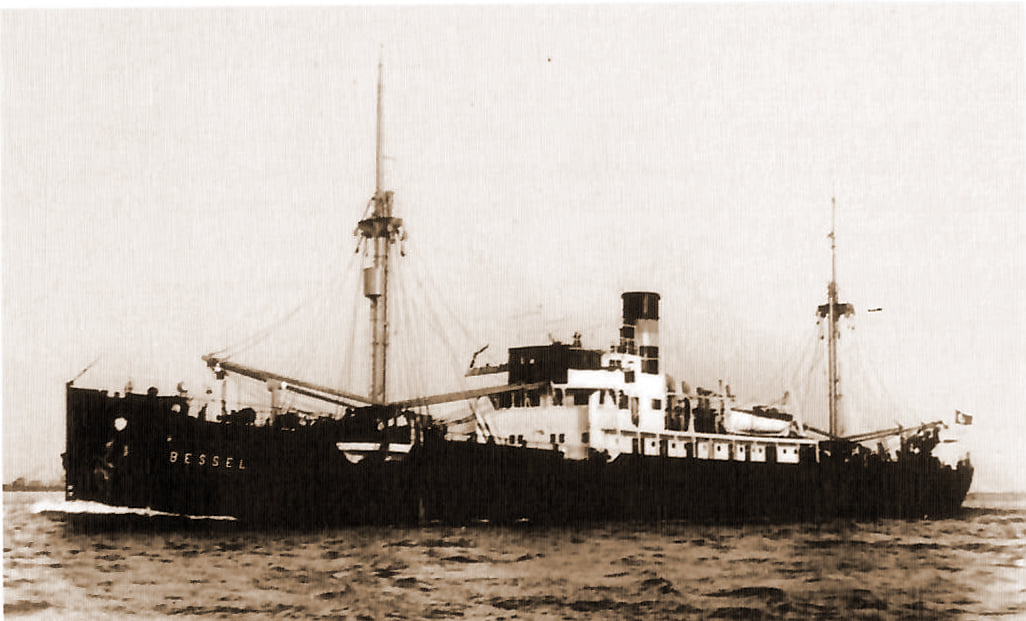
- Bessel

History
- Name: Sorrento (1925–28); Bessel (1928–45); Empire Coniston (1945–47); Birgitte Skou (1947–59); N Martini (1959–61); Nicolo Martini (1961–73)
- Owner: Robert M Sloman Jr (1925–26); Otwi Werke GmbH (1926–28); Dampfschiffahrts-Gesellschaft Neptun (1928–45); Argo Reederei AG (1933–37); Argo Reederei Richard Adler & Co (1937–45); Ministry of War Transport (1945); Ministry of Transport (1945–47); Danish Government (1947); Ove Skou Rederiaktieselskab (1947–59); Armamento Agenzia Marittima Framar (1959–72)
- Operator: Robert M Sloman Jr (1925–26); Otwi Werke GmbH (1926–28); Dampfschiffahrts-Gesellschaft Neptun (1928–45); Argo Reederei AG (1933–37); Argo Reederei Richard Adler & Co (1937–45); Stone & Rolfe Ltd (1945–46); Ove Skou Rederiaktieselskab (1946–58); M Martini (1959–72)
- Port of registry: (Weimar Republic) Hamburg (1925–26); (Weimar Republic) Bremen (1926–33); (Nazi Germany) Bremen (1933–40); (Nazi Germany) Kriegsmarine (1940–45); (United Kingdom) London (1945–47); (Denmark) København (1947–59); (Italy) Genoa (1959–73)
- Builder: AG Weser
- Yard number: 395
- Launched: 1925
- Out of service: April 1958 – September 1959; April 1972 – October 1973
- Identification: Code Letters RFLM (1925–34); Code Letters DOIE (1934–45); Code Letters GTFY (1945–46); Code Letters OXZI (1946–59); United Kingdom Official Number 180717 (1945–47); IMO number: 5251496 ( -1973)
- Fate: Scrapped

General characteristics
- Type: Cargo ship
- Tonnage: 1,878 GRT; 915 NRT
- Length: 283 ft 7 in (86.44 m)
- Beam: 41 ft 7 in (12.67 m)
- Depth: 16 ft 5 in (5.00 m)
- Installed power: 4SCSA diesel engine
- Propulsion: Screw propeller

Bessel was a cargo ship that was built in 1925 as Sorrento by AG Weser, Bremen for German owners. She was sold in 1926 and renamed Bessel. She was seized by the Allies in Vigo, Spain, in May 1945, passed to the Ministry of War Transport (MoWT) and renamed Empire Coniston. In 1946, she was lent to the Danish Government and was allocated to them in 1947. She was sold into Danish merchant service and renamed Birgitte Skou. In 1959, she was sold to Italy and renamed N Martini. She was renamed Nicolo Martini in 1961, serving until 1972 when she ran aground at Portoscuso, Sardinia. Although refloated she was declared a total loss and was scrapped in 1973.

== Description ==
The ship was built in 1925 as yard number 395 by AG Weser, Bremen.

The ship was 283 feet 7 inches (86.44 m) long, with a beam of 41 feet 7 inches (12.67 m). She had a depth of 16 feet 5 inches (5.00 m). The ship had a GRT of 1,878 and a NRT of 915.

The ship was propelled by two 4-stroke Single Cycle Single Acting diesel engines, which had 6 cylinders of 22 1/16 inches (56.0 cm) diameter by 39 3/8 inches (100 cm) stroke. The engines were built by AG Weser.

== History ==
Sorrento was built for Robert M Sloman Jr, Hamburg. In October 1926, she was sold to Otwi Werke GmbH, Bremen and renamed Bessel. In December 1928, she was sold to Dampschiffs Gesellschaft Neptun, Bremen. The Code Letters RFLM were allocated. In 1934, her Code Letters were changed to DOIE.

In 1940, Bessel was requisitioned by the Kriegsmarine. She put into Vigo, Spain, during 1940 where she remained for the duration of the war. Bessel was used to refuel U-boats eight times during the war. Although supposedly a merchant ship, she was camouflaged. In May 1945, she was surrendered to the United Kingdom, and sailed from Vigo to the UK in August 1945.

Ownership passed to the MoWT and she was placed under the management of Stone & Rolfe Ltd. Her port of registry was changed to London and the Code letters GTFY and United Kingdom Official Number 180717 were allocated. In 1946, Empire Coniston was lent to the Danish Government. She was passed to them in 1947 and sold to Ove Skou Rederiaktieselskab in 1947, when she was renamed Birgitte Skou. Her port of registry was changed to København and the Code Letters OXZI were allocated. On 6 November 1951, a fire on board the ship while docked at Valencia, Spain affected the crew accommodation area. Birgitte Skou was repaired and returned to service. On 21 January 1952, there was an industrial dispute while the ship was moored at Helsingør, Denmark. In April 1958, she was laid up in Kobenhavn. In September 1959, Birgitte Skou was sold to Armamento Agenzia Marittima Framar, Genoa, Italy. She was operated under the management of M Martini, Italy and was renamed N Martini. She was renamed Nicolo Martini in 1961. With the introduction of IMO Numbers in the 1960s, Nicolo Martini was allocated the IMO Number 5251496.

On 24 April 1972, Nicolo Martini struck a submerged object at Portoscuso, Sardinia while on a voyage from Caloforte to Genoa. She developed a leak and was beached to prevent her sinking. Although refloated, she was declared a total loss. In December 1972, she was sold for scrap. Nicolo Martini was scrapped in October 1973 at Vado Ligure, Italy.
