= Bessel (crater) =

Crater on the Moon

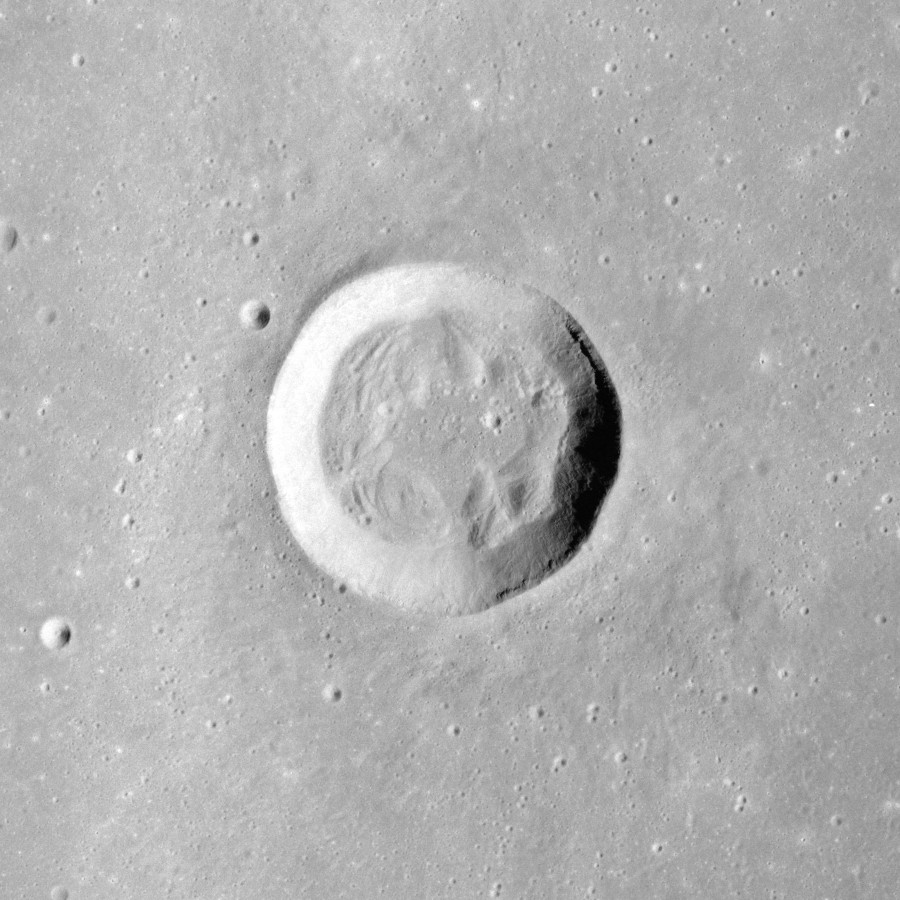
- Apollo 17 Mapping Camera image
- Coordinates: 21.8°N 17.9°E
- Diameter: 15.56 km (9.67 mi)
- Depth: 1.77 km (1.10 mi)
- Colongitude: 342° at sunrise
- Formation: Copernican
- Eponym: Friedrich W. Bessel

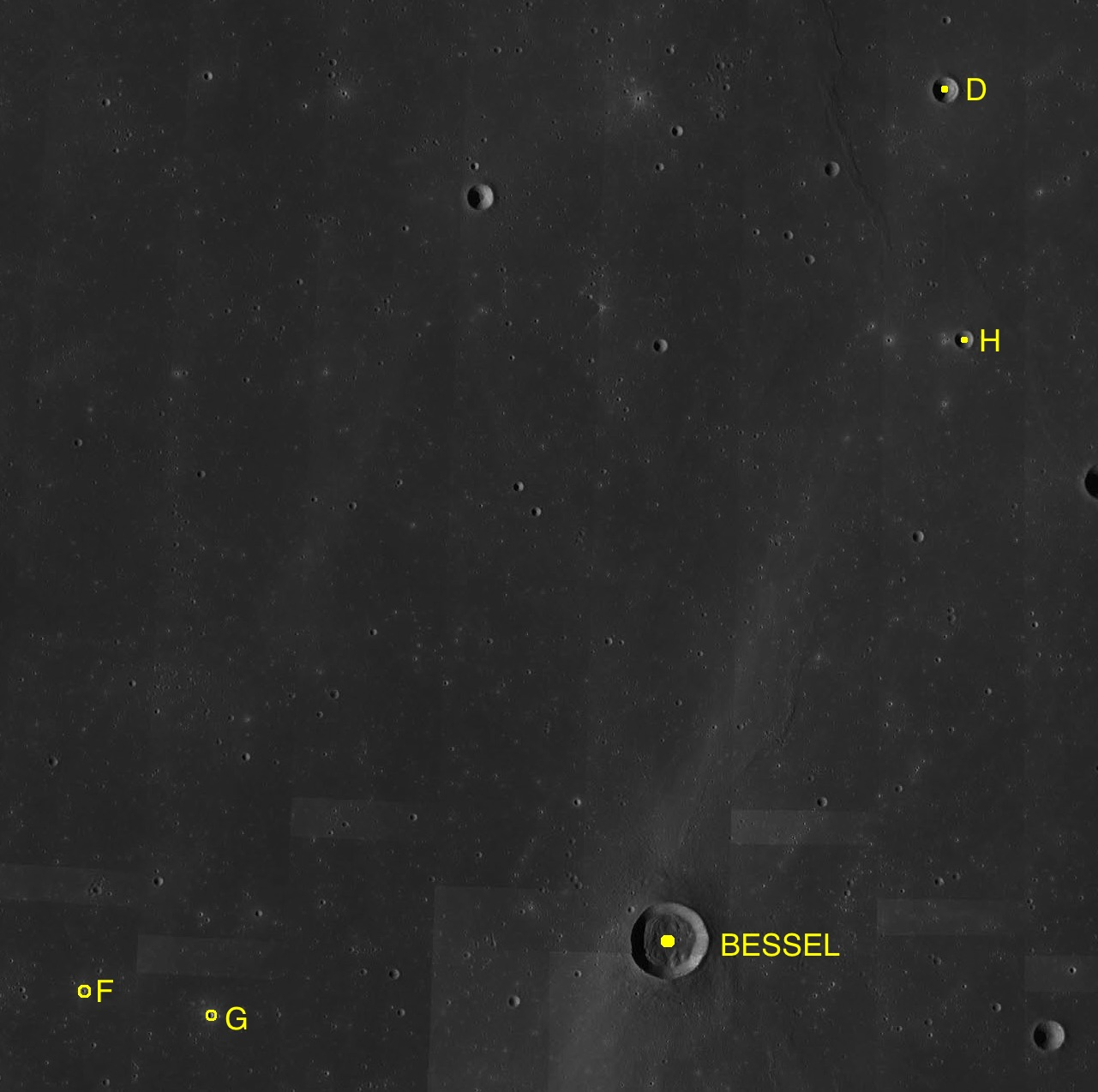
Satellite craters of Bessel

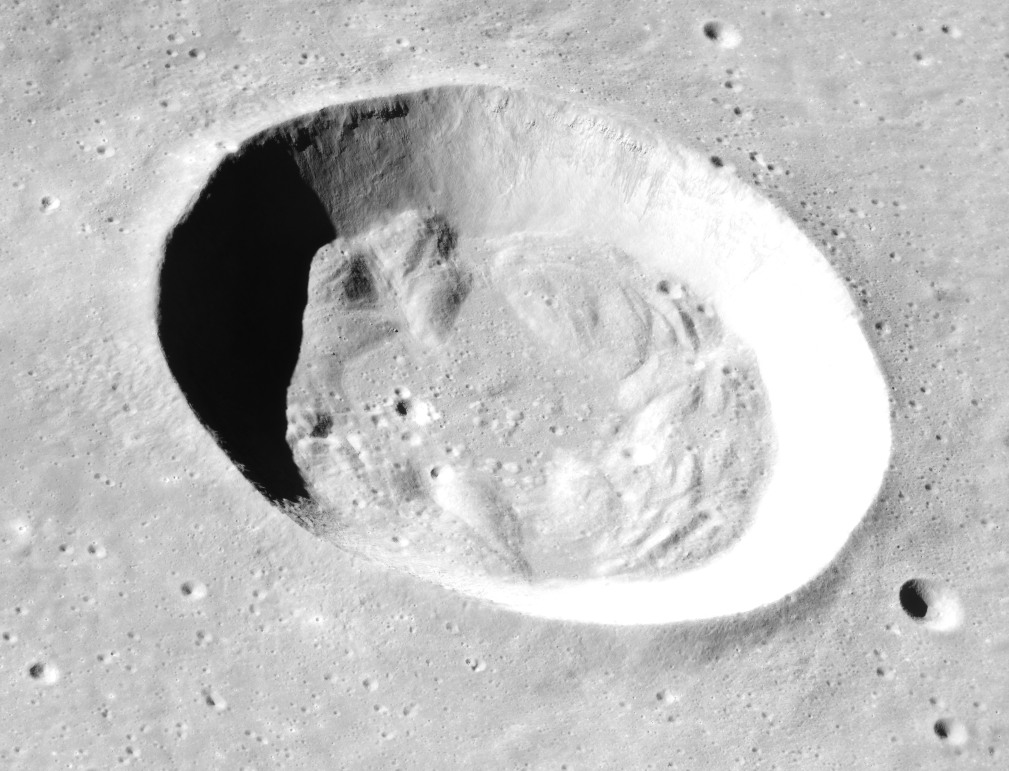
Oblique Apollo 15 Panoramic Camera image (from figure 145, Apollo Over the Moon, NASA SP-362)

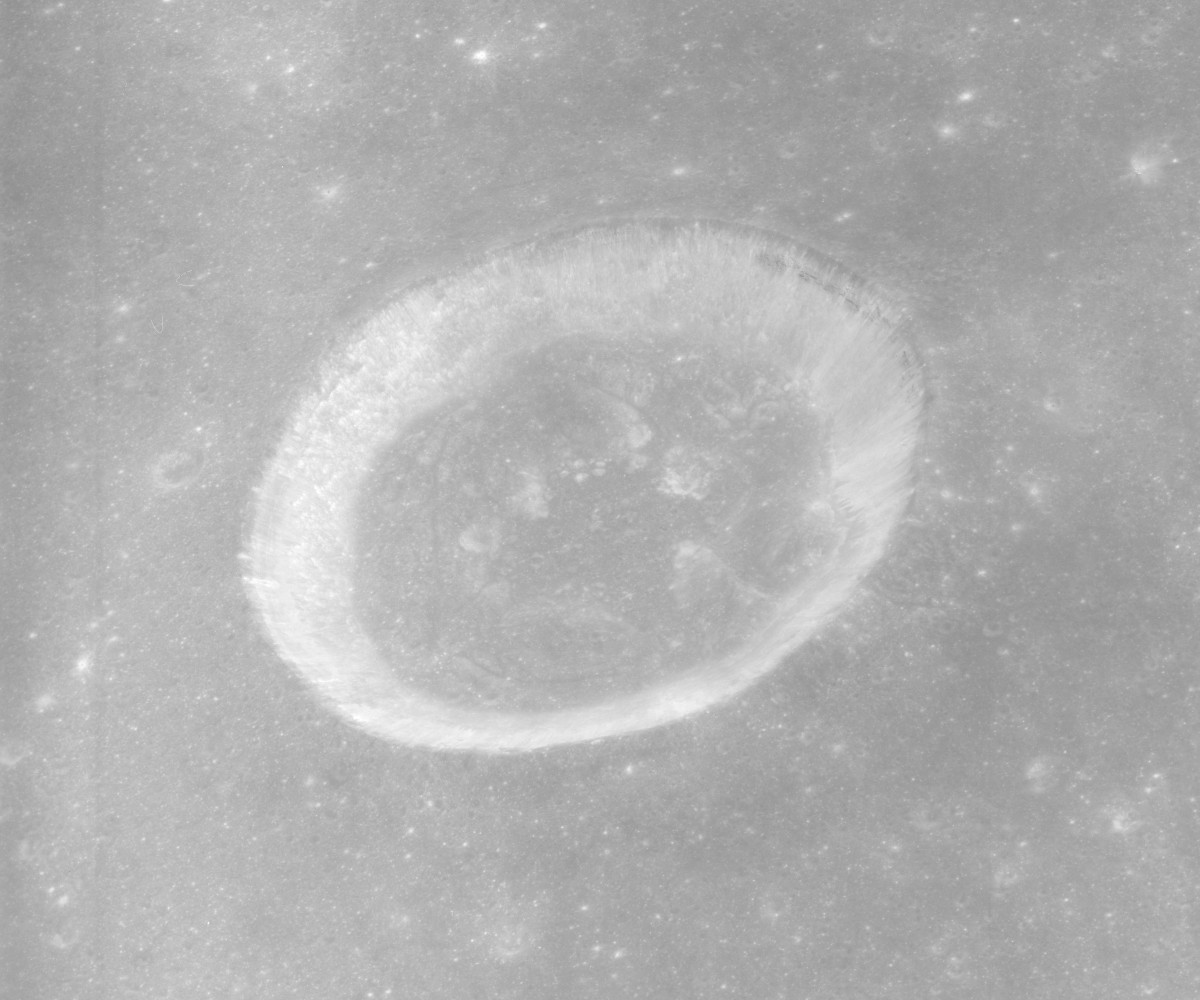
Another view facing north at a higher sun angle from Apollo 15

Bessel is a small lunar impact crater that is located in the southern half of the Mare Serenitatis. Despite its small size, this is the largest crater to lie entirely within the mare. It lies to the north-northeast of the crater Menelaus.

The crater was named after the German astronomer Friedrich Wilhelm Bessel (1784-1846). Its designation was officially adopted by the International Astronomical Union in 1935. The name was incorporated into lunar nomenclature by German astronomer Johann Mädler in 1837.

== Description ==
This crater dates to the Copernican period of the lunar geologic timescale. It is circular and bowl-shaped with a rim that has a higher albedo than the floor or the surrounding mare. The outer rim is not significantly worn, and there are no features of note on the interior, apart from some slumping of material from the inner walls to the floor. Bessel is not of sufficient size to have developed the terrace structures of larger craters. There is a distinct darker layer in the upper half of the wall, roughly 500 m from the rim.

A large ray crosses the mare from north to south, passing Bessel's western side. This ray is enigmatic due to its unclear origin. It appears to originate at the rim of Menelaus crater, yet it aligns with the trajectory of a Tycho ray, suggesting Tycho as a possible source. However, the Tycho ray terminates in the central highlands, hundreds of kilometers south of the Bessel region. Additionally, there are no evident clusters of Tycho secondary craters along the ray between its end in the highlands and the start of the bright ray at Menelaus' rim.

== Satellite craters ==
By convention these features are identified on lunar maps by placing the letter on the side of the crater midpoint that is closest to Bessel.

| Bessel | Latitude | Longitude | Diameter |
|---|---|---|---|
| D | 27.3° N | 19.9° E | 5 km |
| F | 21.2° N | 13.8° E | 1 km |
| G | 21.1° N | 14.7° E | 1 km |
| H | 25.7° N | 20.0° E | 4 km |

The following craters have been renamed by the IAU:

- Bessel A — See Sarabhai (crater).
- Bessel E — See Bobillier (crater).

== See also ==
- 1552 Bessel, main-belt asteroid
