= Fraunhofer (crater) =

Lunar impact crater

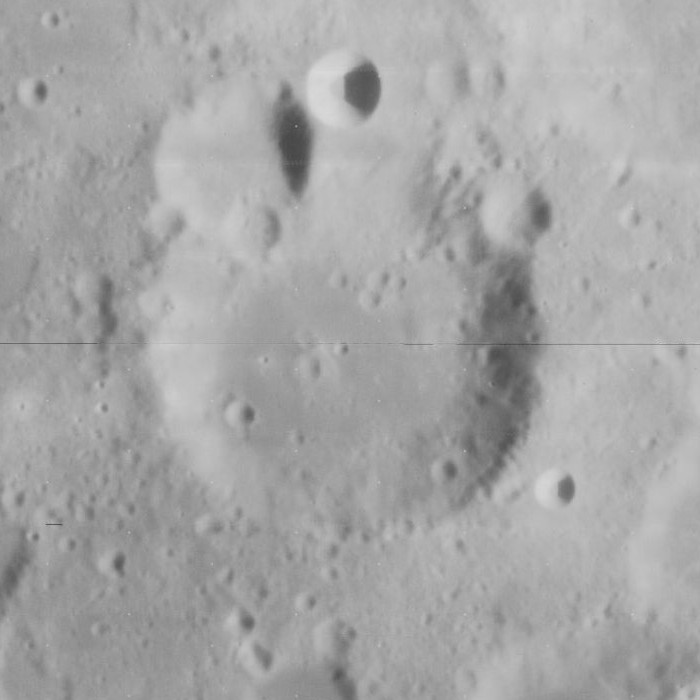
- Lunar Orbiter 4 image
- Coordinates: 39.5°S 59.1°E
- Diameter: 57.75 km (35.88 mi)
- Depth: 1.5 km (0.93 mi)
- Colongitude: 302° at sunrise
- Eponym: Joseph von Fraunhofer

Fraunhofer is a lunar impact crater that is located just to the south-southwest of the walled plain called Furnerius, in the southeastern part of the Moon. This crater appears foreshortened when viewed from the Earth, and is actually nearly circular.

This crater has undergone some erosion from lesser impacts, particularly along the northern part of the rim. The satellite crater Fraunhofer V lies along the northwestern edge and part of the inner wall. A pair of smaller craters also lie along the northern rim. The remainder of the rim is relatively intact, with small craterlets along parts of the inner wall. The interior floor is nearly level and is marked by several small craterlets. The southern two-thirds of the floor has a slightly lower albedo than the northern part.

This formation is named after German astronomer and optician Joseph von Fraunhofer (1787-1826). His name was incorporated with the lunar nomenclature of German astronomer Johann H. Mädler during the 19th century. Its designation was formally adopted in 1935 by the International Astronomical Union.

== Satellite craters ==
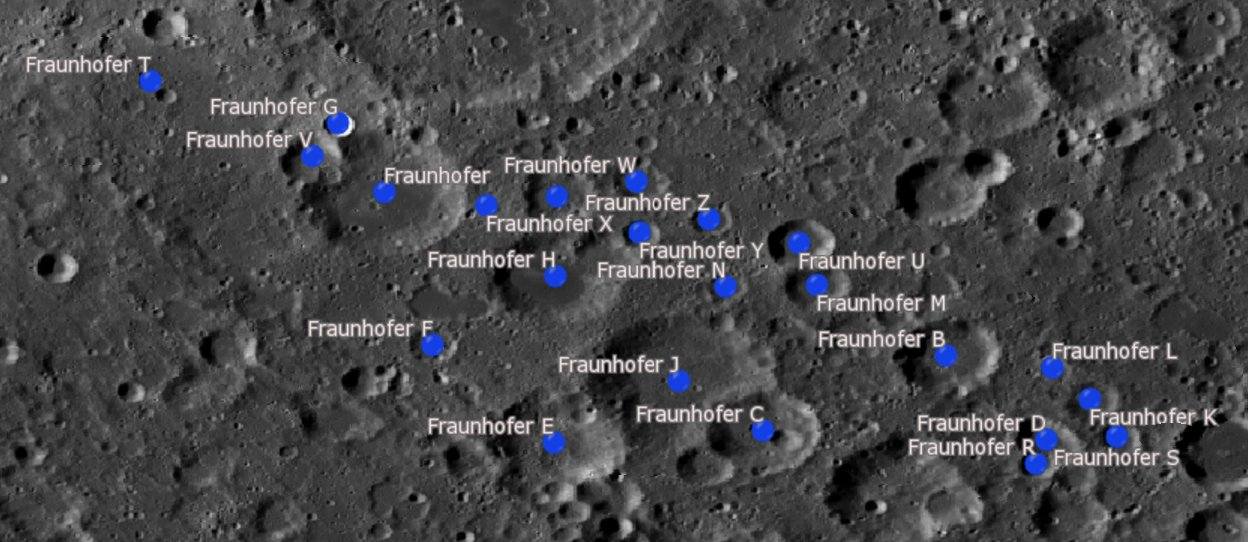
Satellite features and surroundings

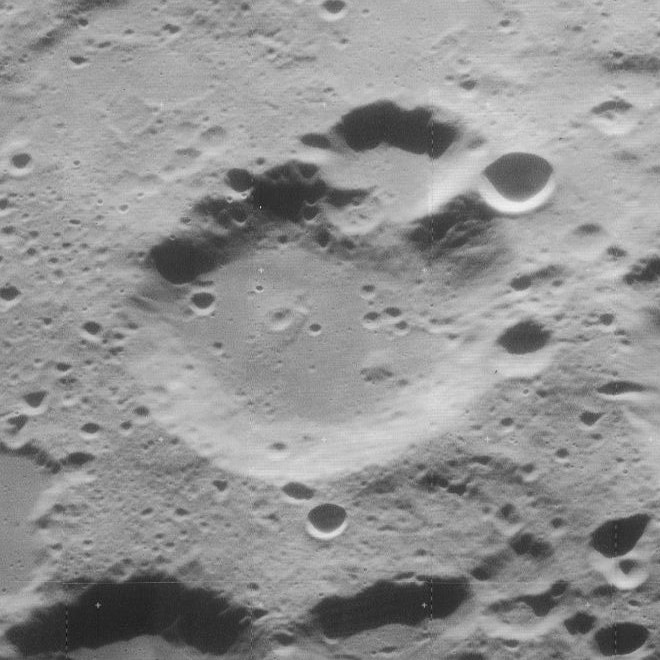
Oblique Lunar Orbiter 4 image, facing northwest

By convention these features are identified on lunar maps by placing the letter on the side of the crater midpoint that is closest to Fraunhofer.

Fraunhofer	Latitude	Longitude	Diameter
A	39.6° S	61.7° E	29 km
B	41.8° S	67.3° E	36 km
C	42.9° S	64.7° E	38 km
D	43.1° S	69.0° E	17 km
E	43.4° S	61.7° E	42 km
F	41.7° S	59.8° E	16 km
G	38.5° S	58.3° E	11 km
H	40.8° S	61.7° E	43 km
J	42.4° S	63.6° E	63 km
K	42.5° S	69.3° E	16 km
L	42.1° S	68.8° E	8 km
M	40.9° S	65.6° E	21 km
N	40.9° S	64.4° E	12 km
R	43.5° S	68.7° E	11 km
S	43.1° S	69.9° E	13 km
T	37.9° S	55.7° E	8 km
U	40.2° S	65.1° E	24 km
V	39.0° S	58.0° E	24 km
W	39.4° S	62.8° E	18 km
X	39.7° S	60.6° E	6 km
Y	40.2° S	63.0° E	13 km
Z	39.9° S	63.9° E	14 km
