= Alfred Bessell-Browne =

Australian general

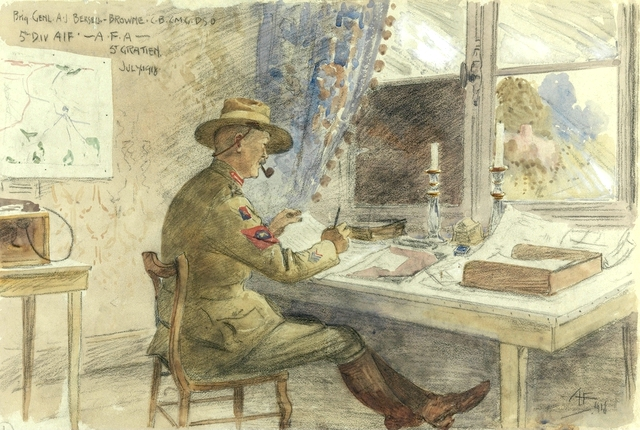
- Portrait of Brigadier General Alfred Joseph Bessell-Browne
- Born: 3 September 1877; Auckland, New Zealand
- Died: 3 August 1947 (aged 69)
- Military career
- Allegiance: Australian Army
- Service years: 1899–1919; 1940–1942
- Rank: Brigadier General
- Units: Perth Artillery Volunteers; 1st Western Australian (Mounted Infantry) Contingent; 5th Western Australian Contingent; 1st Western Australian Field Battery
- Commands: 37th Field Battery; 3rd Field Artillery Brigade; 2nd Field Artillery Brigade; 5th Division Artillery; Volunteer Defence Corps in Western Australia
- Conflicts: Second Boer War; First World War; Gallipoli Campaign; Battle of Arras; Battle of Pozières; Battle of Passchendaele; Second World War
- Awards: Companion of the Order of the Bath; Companion of the Order of St Michael and St George; Distinguished Service Order; Mentioned in Despatches (9); Distinguished Service Medal (United States)

Brigadier General Alfred Joseph Bessell-Browne CB, CMG, DSO (3 September 1877 – 3 August 1947) was an Australian Army colonel and temporary brigadier general in the First World War. He retired as a brigadier general in 1942.

== Early life and career ==
Alfred Bessell-Browne was born in Auckland, New Zealand, on 3 September 1877, the son of an insurance inspector. The family immigrated to New South Wales where Bessell-Browne attended Camden Grammar. They later moved to Western Australia where he attended Perth High School (now known as Hale School). Bessell-Browne first job was as a clerk in the patents office in 1896.

Bessell-Browne enlisted in the Perth Artillery Volunteers held the rank of sergeant in 1899 when he volunteered for South Africa, enlisting in the 1st Western Australian (Mounted Infantry) Contingent as a private. His unit reached Cape Town in November 1899 and took part in the Kimberley Relief Force and operations at Colesberg, Hoot Neck, Zand River, Klipps River and many other actions. Bessell-Browne was quickly promoted through the non commissioned ranks and was commissioned as a lieutenant on 21 April 1900. He returned to Australia in March 1901 and immediately joined the 5th Western Australian Contingent as a lieutenant, serving as adjutant and then second in command. Bessell-Browne was promoted to captain in June 1901 and in July was mentioned in despatches and awarded the Distinguished Service Order. From March to May 1902 he was attached to the staff of General F. Wing.

Bessell-Browne returned to Australia in May 1902 and rejoined the 1st Western Australian Field Battery with the rank of lieutenant and honorary captain. He was promoted to captain in 1908 and the following year took the Diploma of Military Science course at the University of Sydney. He was promoted to major on 28 August 1911, and took command of his battery, now known as the 37th Field Battery.

== First World War ==
On 28 August 1914, Bessell-Browne was appointed to the Australian Imperial Force with the rank of major and given command of the 8th Field Artillery Battery. He called for volunteers from his battery, the whole parade stepped forward. Bessell-Browne and his battery departed Fremantle for Egypt on 2 November 1914 and arrived there on 12 December.

Bessell-Browne arrived at Anzac Cove on 1 May 1915, his unit was restricted by a lack of good gun positions. Bessell-Browne and his unit saw repeated action on Anzac both in support of Australian troops and by direst fire on Turkish positions. On 2 August 1915, Bessell-Browne took over as commander of the 3rd Field Artillery Brigade. He was switched to the 2nd Field Artillery Brigade on 27 August, back to the 3rd again on 8 September and then back to the 2nd on 13 September. During the evacuation of Anzac he commanded the Rear Party Artillery. For his services at Gallipoli, Bessell-Browne was made a Companion of the Order of St Michael and St George and mentioned in despatches.

Bessell-Browne was promoted to temporary lieutenant colonel on 15 October 1915, a promotion made permanent on 1 January 1916. He was evacuated to Egypt sick on 12 January 1916. He rejoined the 2nd Field Artillery Brigade in Egypt on 19 February 1916. It embarked for France on 12 March. Bessell-Browne's brigade participated in the attack on Pozières, which saw first use of a creeping barrage by Australian troops. On 8 September 1916 he was attached to the 1st Division Artillery and took command of them from 28 September 1916 to 18 January 1917 in the absence of Brigadier General Hobbs.

On 18 January 1917, Bessell-Browne became commander of the 5th Division Artillery. Two days later he was promoted to colonel and temporary brigadier general. He commanded the 5th Division Artillery at Bullecourt and Third Ypres, where he employed artillery to cover the flank. In the mobile warfare that followed the German offensive of 1918, Bessell-Browne showed himself flexible and adaptable and pioneered new tactics to provide close support for infantry. In the attack on Bellecourt, he was able to put down an accurate barrage at 90 degrees from the line of sight to cover the attack at Le Catelet. From 16 to 24 October 1918, Bessell-Browne commanded the US 30th Division's artillery, for which he was awarded the American Army Distinguished Service Medal. The citation for the medal reads:

The President of the United States of America, authorized by Act of Congress, July 9, 1918, takes pleasure in presenting the Army Distinguished Service Medal to Brigadier General Alfred J. Bessell-Brown, Royal British Army, for exceptionally meritorious and distinguished service in a position of great responsibility to the Government of the United States, during World War I, while serving with the 5th Australian Division, British Expeditionary Forces. The relations of the American and Australian forces, cooperating with each other, were always marked with the utmost harmony, but never was the spirit more clearly manifested than during the period from 16 to 19 October 1918 when the 30th U.S. Division went forward in attack against the enemy, supported by artillery under General Bessell-Brown's command. To his consummate technical skill and unflagging energy is due much credit for the successful results attained in these operations.

On 8 November, Bessell-Browne took Anzac leave to return to Australia on furlough. The war ended three days later due to the armistice of 11 November 1918 so he rejoined the 5th Division's artillery on 1 December. He finally returned to Australia on 19 April 1919 and was demobilised in July. For his services on the Western Front, Bessell-Browne was made a Companion of the Order of the Bath (CB) and had been mentioned in despatches no less than nine times.

== Post war ==
After the war, he established an indent agents' firm. During the Second World War he commanded the Volunteer Defence Corps in Western Australia. He retired as a brigadier general in 1942.

Bessell-Browne died on 3 August 1947 and was cremated with full military honours.
