= Joseph von Fraunhofer =

German physicist (1787–1826)

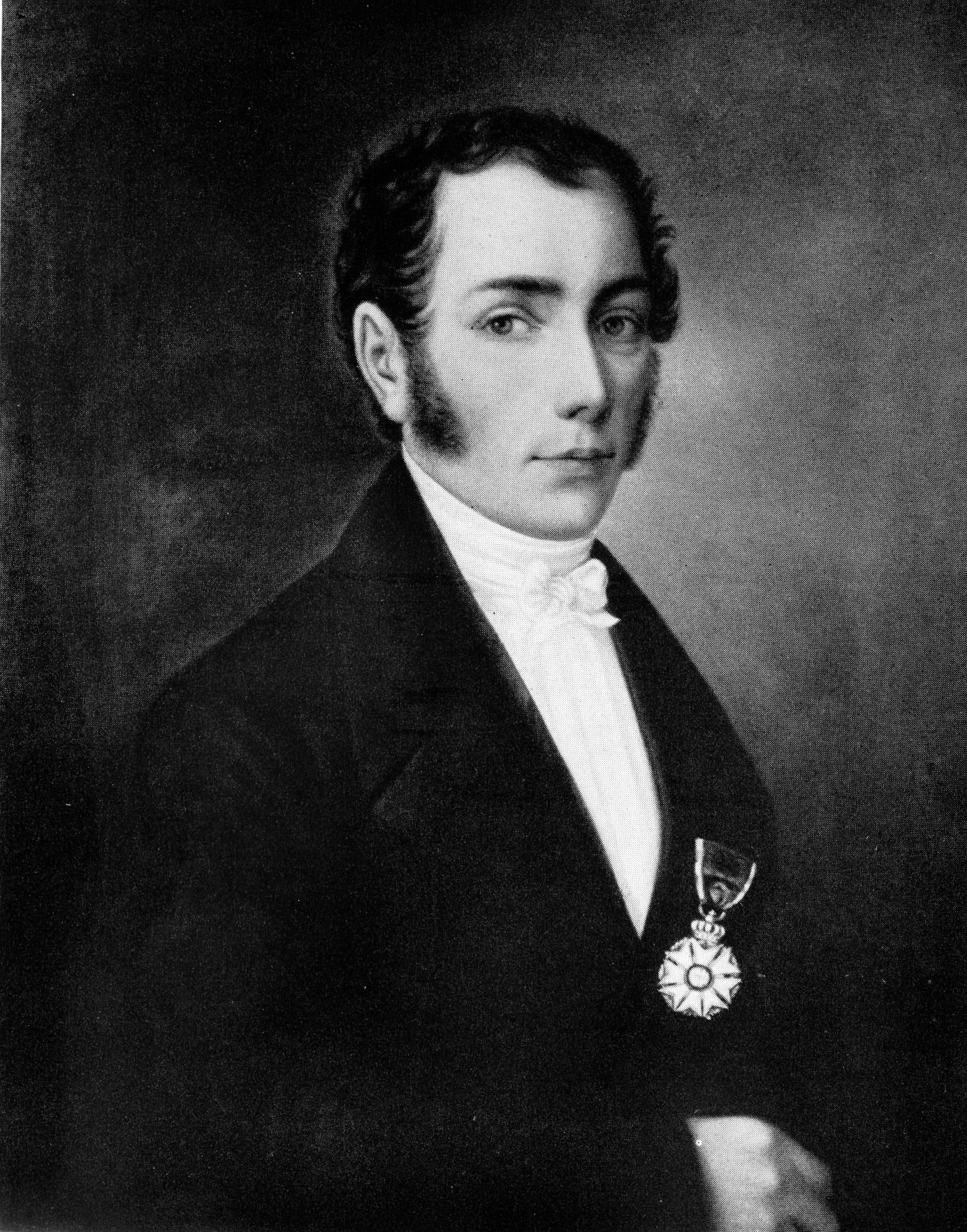
- Born: Joseph Fraunhofer; 6 March 1787; Straubing, Electorate of Bavaria
- Died: 7 June 1826 (aged 39); Munich, Kingdom of Bavaria
- Known for: Fraunhofer diffraction Fraunhofer lines Fraunhofer distance
- Scientific career
- Fields: Optics

Joseph Ritter von Fraunhofer (/ˈfraʊnˌhoʊfər/; German: [ˈfraʊnˌhoːfɐ]; 6 March 1787 – 7 June 1826) was a German physicist and optical lens manufacturer. He made optical glass, an achromatic telescope, and objective lenses. He developed diffraction gratings and also invented the spectroscope. In 1814, he discovered and studied the dark absorption lines in the spectrum of the sun now known as Fraunhofer lines.

The German research organization Fraunhofer Society, which is Europe's biggest Society for the advancement of applied research, is named after him. Fraunhofer lines are used in astronomy to determine the composition of celestial bodies. His epitaph reads Aproximavit sidera, Latin for 'He brought closer the stars.'

== Early life ==
Joseph Fraunhofer was the 11th child, born into a Roman Catholic family in Straubing, in the Electorate of Bavaria, to Franz Xaver Fraunhofer and Maria Anna Fröhlich. His father and paternal grandfather Johann Michael had been master glassmakers in Straubing. Fröhlich's family also came from a lineage of glassmakers going back to the 16th century. He was orphaned at the age of 11 and started working as an apprentice to a harsh glassmaker named Philipp Anton Weichelsberger.

In 1801, the workshop in which he was working collapsed, and he was buried in the rubble. The rescue operation was led by Prince-Elector Maximilian Joseph. The prince entered Fraunhofer's life, providing him with books and forcing his employer to allow the young Fraunhofer time to study.

== Education ==
Joseph Utzschneider, a privy councilor, was also at the site of the disaster, and would also become a benefactor to Fraunhofer. With the money given to him by the prince upon his rescue and the support he received from Utzschneider, Fraunhofer was able to continue his education alongside his practical training. In 1806, Utzschneider and Georg von Reichenbach brought Fraunhofer into their Institute at Benediktbeuern, a secularised Benedictine monastery devoted to glassmaking. There he discovered how to make fine optical glass and invented precise methods for measuring optical dispersion.

It was at the Institute that Fraunhofer met Pierre-Louis Guinand (de), a Swiss glass technician, who instructed Fraunhofer in glassmaking at Utzschneider's behest. By 1809, the mechanical part of the Optical Institute was chiefly under Fraunhofer's direction, and Fraunhofer became one of the members of the firm that same year.

== Career ==
In 1814, Guinand left the firm, as did Reichenbach. Guinand would later become a partner with Fraunhofer in the firm, and the name was changed to Utzschneider-und-Fraunhofer. During 1818, Fraunhofer became the director of the Optical Institute. Due to the fine optical instruments developed by Fraunhofer, Bavaria overtook England as the center of the optics industry. Even the likes of Michael Faraday were unable to produce glass that could rival Fraunhofer.

His illustrious career eventually earned him an honorary doctorate from the University of Erlangen in 1822. In 1824, Fraunhofer was appointed a Knight of the Order of Merit of the Bavarian Crown by King Maximilian I, through which he was raised into personal nobility (with the title "Ritter von", i.e. knight). The same year, he was also made an honorary citizen of Munich.

Like many glassmakers of his era, he was poisoned by heavy metal vapors, resulting in his premature death. Fraunhofer died in 1826 at the age of 39. His most valuable glassmaking recipes are thought to have gone to the grave with him.

== Invention and scientific research ==
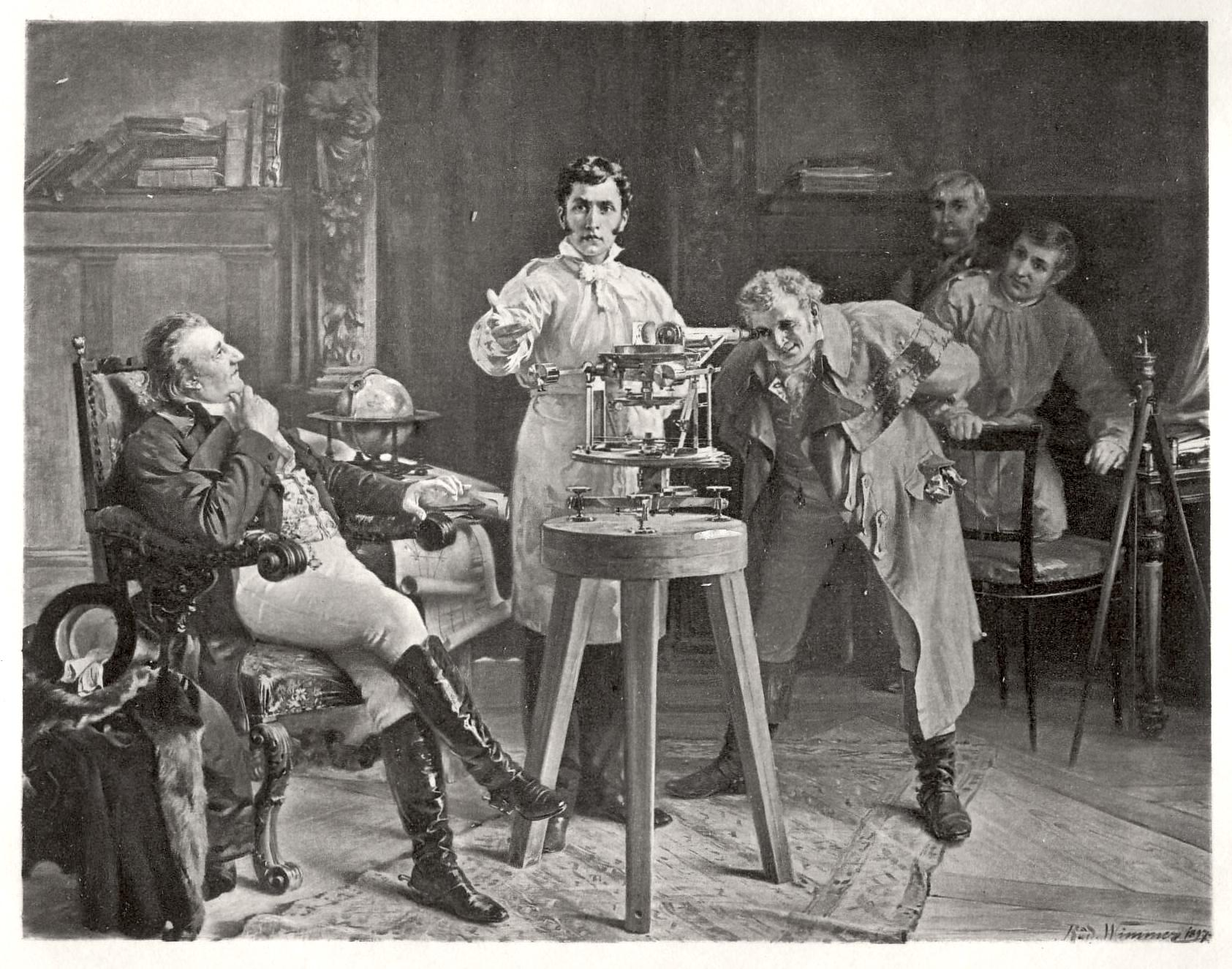
Fraunhofer demonstrating the spectroscope

One of the most difficult operations of practical optics during the time period of Fraunhofer's life was accurately polishing the spherical surfaces of large object glasses. Fraunhofer invented the machine which rendered the surface more accurately than conventional grinding. He also invented other grinding and polishing machines and introduced many improvements into the manufacture of the different kinds of glass used for optical instruments, which he always found to have flaws and irregularities of various sorts.

In 1811, he constructed a new kind of furnace, and during his second melting session when he melted a large quantity of glass, he found that he could produce flint glass, which, when taken from the bottom of a vessel containing roughly 100 kilograms (224 lb) of glass, had the same refractive power as glass taken from the surface. He found that English crown glass and German table glass both contained defects which tended to cause irregular refraction. In the thicker and larger glasses, there would be even more of such defects, so that in larger telescopes this kind of glass would not be fit for objective lenses. Fraunhofer accordingly made his own crown glass.

It was thought that the accurate determination of power for a given medium to refract rays of light and separate the different colors which they contain was impeded by the absence of precise boundaries between the colors of the spectrum, making it difficult to accurately measure the angle of refraction. To address this limitation, Fraunhofer performed a series of experiments for the purpose of producing homogeneous light artificially, and unable to effect his object in a direct way, he did so by means of lamps and prisms.

=== Discovery of dark absorption lines ===
By 1814, Fraunhofer had invented the modern spectroscope. In the course of his experiments, he discovered a bright fixed line which appears in the orange color of the spectrum when it is produced by the light of fire. This line enabled him afterward to determine the absolute power of refraction in different substances. Experiments to ascertain whether the solar spectrum contained the same bright line in orange as the line produced by the orange of fire light led him to the discovery of 574 dark fixed lines in the solar spectrum. Today, millions of such fixed absorption lines are now known.

Continuing to investigate, Fraunhofer detected dark lines also appearing in the spectra of several bright stars, but in slightly different arrangements. He ruled out the possibility that the lines were produced as the light passes through the Earth’s atmosphere. If that were the case they would not appear in different arrangements. He concluded that the lines originate in the nature of the stars and sun and carry information about the source of light, regardless of how far away that source is. He found that the spectra of Sirius and other first-magnitude stars differed from the sun and from each other, thus founding stellar spectroscopy.

These dark fixed lines were later shown to be mostly atomic absorption lines, as explained by Kirchhoff and Bunsen in 1859, with the rest identified as telluric lines originating from absorption by oxygen molecules in the Earth's atmosphere. These lines are still called Fraunhofer lines in his honor; his discovery had gone far beyond the half-dozen apparent divisions in the solar spectrum that had previously been noted by Wollaston in 1802.

=== Invention of optical instruments ===
Fraunhofer also developed a diffraction grating in 1821, after James Gregory discovered the phenomenon of diffraction grating and after the American astronomer David Rittenhouse invented the first manmade diffraction grating in 1785. Fraunhofer was the first who used a diffraction grating to obtain line spectra and the first who measured the wavelengths of spectral lines with a diffraction grating.

Ultimately, however, his primary passion was still practical optics; he once wrote that "In all my experiments I could, owing to lack of time, pay attention to only those matters which appeared to have a bearing upon practical optics".

== Telescopes and optical instruments ==
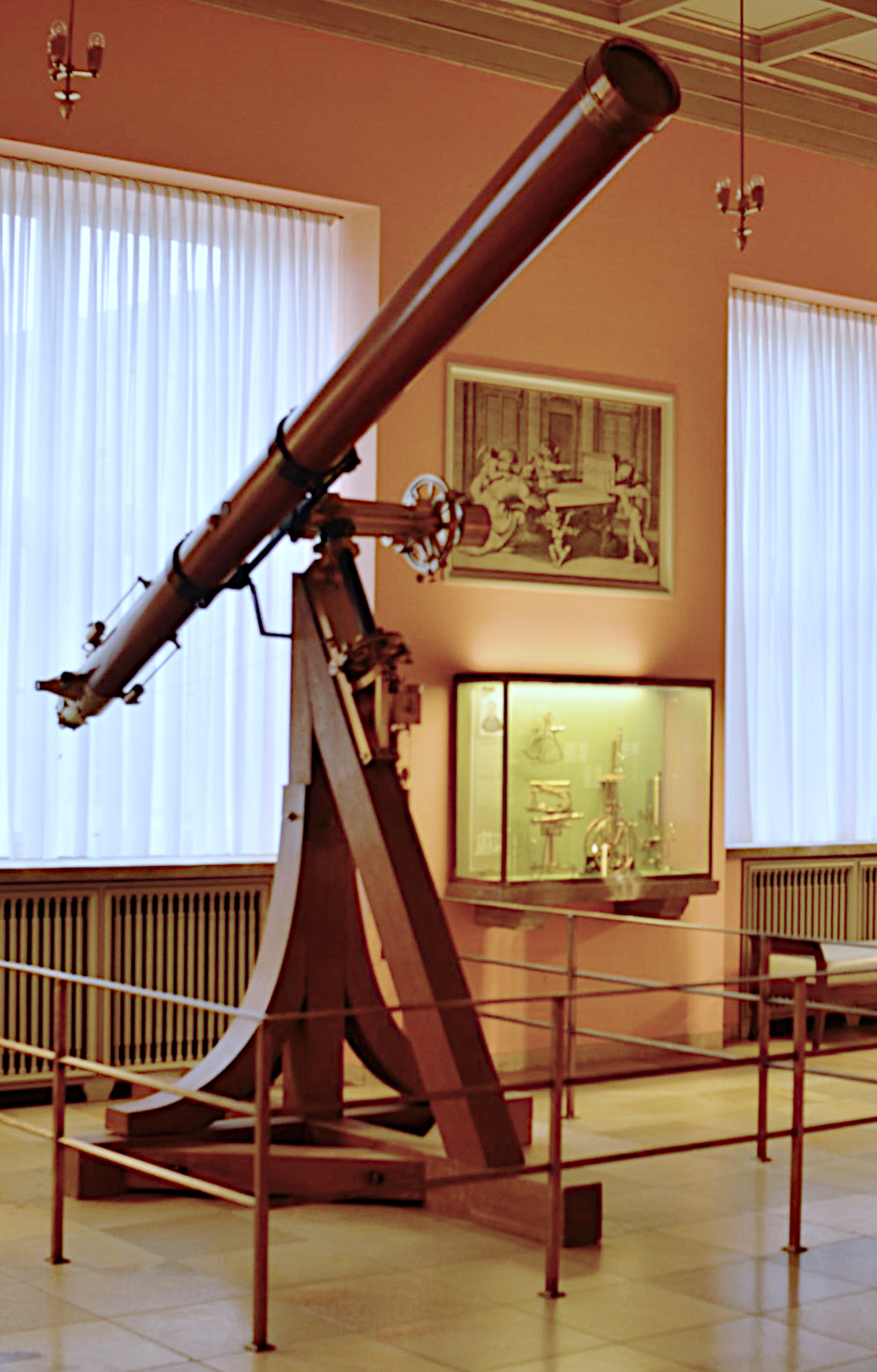
The 9"-aperture refractor telescope with which Neptune was discovered

Fraunhofer produced various optical instruments for his firm. These included the 7‑inch equatorial telescope for the Naples Observatory, completed in 1814; the Fraunhofer Dorpat Refractor used by Struve (delivered 1824 to Dorpat Observatory); and the Bessel Heliometer (delivered posthumously), which were both used to collect data for stellar parallax. The firm's successor, Merz und Mahler, made a telescope for the New Berlin Observatory, which confirmed the existence of the major planet Neptune. Possibly the last telescope objective made by Fraunhofer was supplied for a transit telescope at the City Observatory, Edinburgh, the telescope itself being completed by Repsold of Hamburg after Fraunhofer's death.

== Works ==
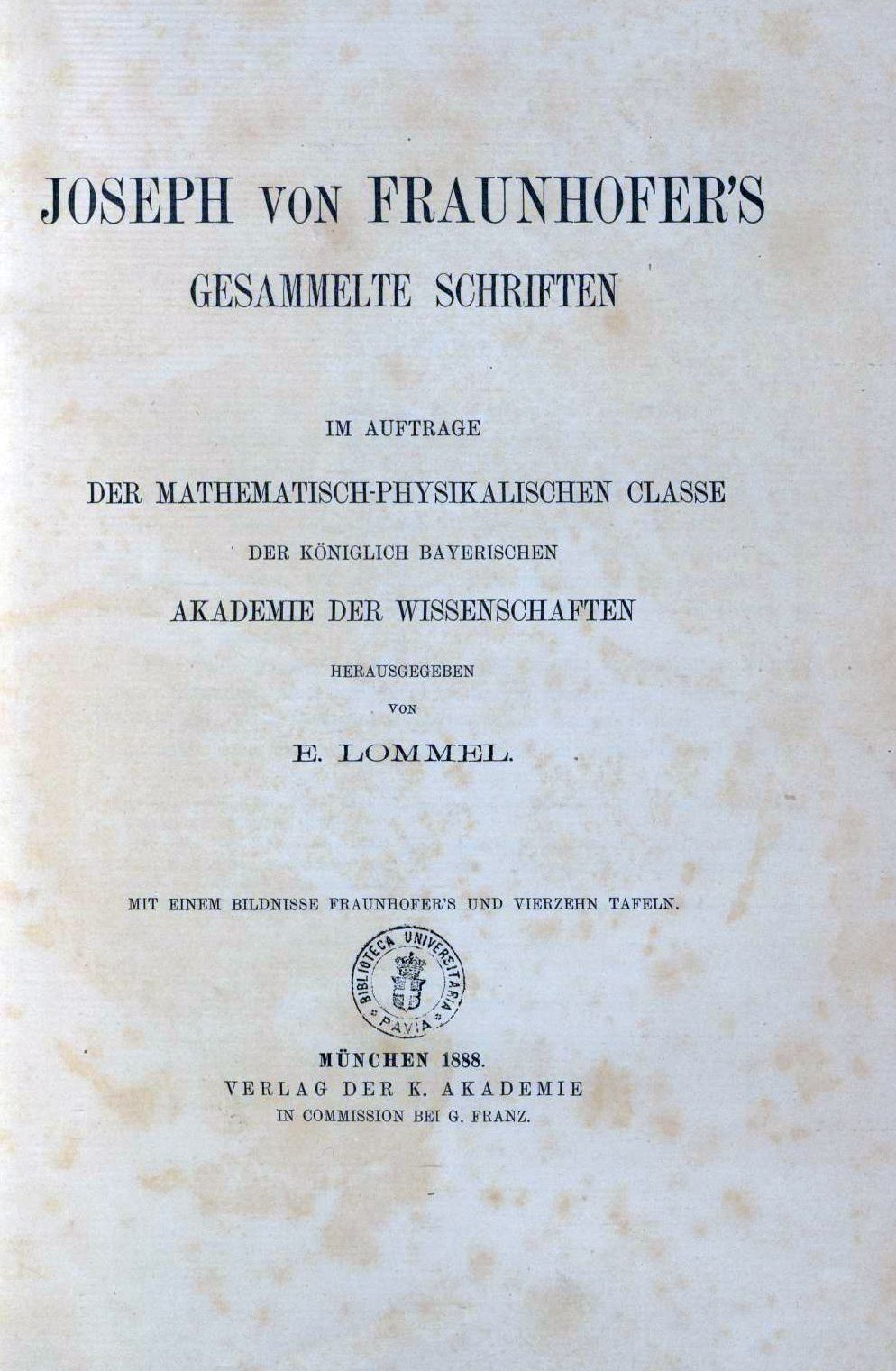
Opere, 1888

- Kurzer Umriß der Lebens-Geschichte des Herrn Dr. Joseph von Fraunhofer. By Joseph von Utzschneider. Rösl, 1826.
- [Opere] (in German). München: Verlag der königlich Akademie. 1888.
- Prismatic and diffraction spectra: memoirs. By Joseph von Fraunhofer, William Hyde Wollaston. American Book Co., 1899.

== See also ==
- Fraunhofer (crater)
- German inventors and discoverers
