= Dirichlet eigenvalue =

Modes of vibration in mathematics

In mathematics, the Dirichlet eigenvalues are the fundamental modes of vibration of an idealized drum with a given shape. The problem of whether one can hear the shape of a drum is: given the Dirichlet eigenvalues, what features of the shape of the drum can one deduce. Here a "drum" is thought of as an elastic membrane Ω, which is represented as a planar domain whose boundary is fixed. The Dirichlet eigenvalues are found by solving the following problem for an unknown function u ≠ 0 and eigenvalue λ

$$\begin{cases} \Delta u + \lambda u = 0& \rm{in\ }\Omega\\ u|_{\partial\Omega} =0.& \end{cases}$$	1

Here Δ is the Laplacian, which is given in xy-coordinates by

$$\Delta u = \frac{\partial^2u}{\partial x^2} + \frac{\partial^2 u}{\partial y^2}.$$

The boundary value problem (1) is the Dirichlet problem for the Helmholtz equation, and so λ is known as a Dirichlet eigenvalue for Ω. Dirichlet eigenvalues are contrasted with Neumann eigenvalues: eigenvalues for the corresponding Neumann problem. The Laplace operator Δ appearing in (1) is often known as the Dirichlet Laplacian when it is considered as accepting only functions u satisfying the Dirichlet boundary condition. More generally, in spectral geometry one considers (1) on a manifold with boundary Ω. Then Δ is taken to be the Laplace–Beltrami operator, also with Dirichlet boundary conditions.

It can be shown, using the spectral theorem for compact self-adjoint operators that the eigenspaces are finite-dimensional and that the Dirichlet eigenvalues λ are real, positive, and have no limit point. Thus they can be arranged in increasing order:

$$0<\lambda_1\le\lambda_2\le\cdots,\quad \lambda_n\to\infty,$$

where each eigenvalue is counted according to its geometric multiplicity. The eigenspaces are orthogonal in the space of square-integrable functions, and consist of smooth functions. In fact, the Dirichlet Laplacian has a continuous extension to an operator from the Sobolev space $H^2_0(\Omega)$ into $L^2(\Omega)$. This operator is invertible, and its inverse is compact and self-adjoint so that the usual spectral theorem can be applied to obtain the eigenspaces of Δ and the reciprocals 1/λ of its eigenvalues.

One of the primary tools in the study of the Dirichlet eigenvalues is the max-min principle: the first eigenvalue λ_{1} minimizes the Dirichlet energy. To wit,

$$\lambda_1 = \inf_{u\not=0}\frac{\int_\Omega |\nabla u|^2}{\int_\Omega |u|^2},$$

the infimum is taken over all u of compact support that do not vanish identically in Ω. By a density argument, this infimum agrees with that taken over nonzero $u\in H_0^1(\Omega)$. Moreover, using results from the calculus of variations analogous to the Lax–Milgram theorem, one can show that a minimizer exists in $H_0^1(\Omega)$. More generally, one has

$$\lambda_k = \sup\inf \frac{\int_\Omega |\nabla u|^2}{\int_\Omega |u|^2}$$

where the supremum is taken over all (k−1)-tuples $\phi_1,\dots,\phi_{k-1}\in H^1_0(\Omega)$ and the infimum over all u orthogonal to the $\phi_i$.

== Applications ==
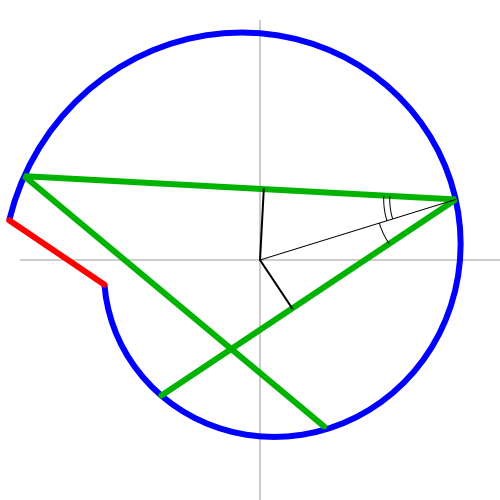
Fig.1. Spiral-shaped boundary of the domain (blue), its chunk (red), and 3 segments of a ray (green).

The Dirichlet Laplacian may arise from various problems of mathematical physics; it may refer to modes of at idealized drum, small waves at the surface of an idealized pool, as well as to a mode of an idealized optical fiber in the paraxial approximation. The last application is most practical in connection to the double-clad fibers; in such fibers, it is important, that most of modes of the fill the domain uniformly, or the most of rays cross the core. The poorest shape seems to be the circularly-symmetric domain ,. The modes of pump should not avoid the active core used in double-clad fiber amplifiers. The spiral-shaped domain happens to be especially efficient for such an application due to the boundary behavior of modes of Dirichlet laplacian.

The theorem about boundary behavior of the Dirichlet Laplacian if analogy of the property of rays in geometrical optics (Fig.1); the angular momentum of a ray (green) increases at each reflection from the spiral part of the boundary (blue), until the ray hits the chunk (red); all rays (except those parallel to the optical axis) unavoidly visit the region in vicinity of the chunk to frop the excess of the angular momentum. Similarly, all the modes of the Dirichlet Laplacian have non-zero values in vicinity of the chunk. The normal component of the derivative of the mode at the boundary can be interpreted as pressure; the pressure integrated over the surface gives the force. As the mode is steady-state solution of the propagation equation (with trivial dependence of the longitudinal coordinate), the total force should be zero. Similarly, the angular momentum of the force of pressure should be also zero. However, there exists a formal proof, which does not refer to the analogy with the physical system.

== See also ==
- Rayleigh–Faber–Krahn inequality
- Nodal line conjecture
