= Lanzani =

Lanzani is an Italian surname. Notable people with this surname include:

- Andrea Lanzani (c. 1645 – 1712), Italian painter
- Bernardino Lanzani (1460 – c. 1530), Italian painter
- Carolina Lanzani (1875 – ?), Italian historian
- Juan Pedro Lanzani (born 1990), Argentine actor
- Loredana Lanzani (born 1965), Italian-American mathematician
- Mario Lanzani (born 1963), Italian chess player
- Stella Maris Lanzani (born 1957), Argentine actor
- Vittorio Lanzani (born 1951), Italian Catholic bishop
