= Balayage =

Method for reconstructing a harmonic function in a domain

In potential theory, a mathematical discipline, balayage (from French: balayage "scanning, sweeping") is a method devised by Henri Poincaré for reconstructing a harmonic function in a domain from its values on the boundary of the domain.

In modern terms, the balayage operator maps a measure $\mu$ on a closed domain $D$ to a measure $\nu$ on the boundary $\part D$, so that the Newtonian potentials of $\mu$ and $\nu$ coincide outside $\bar D$. The procedure is called balayage since the mass is "swept out" from $D$ onto the boundary.

For $x$ in $D$, the balayage of $\delta_x$ yields the harmonic measure $\nu_x$ corresponding to $x$. Then the value of a harmonic function $f$ at $x$ is equal to
$$f(x) = \int_{\partial D} f(y) \, d\nu_x(y).$$

== Examples ==
The field of a positive charge above a flat conducting surface, found by the method of images.

In gravity, Newton's shell theorem is an example. Consider a uniform mass distribution within a solid ball $B$ in $\mathbb{R}^3$. The balayage of this mass distribution onto the surface of the ball (a sphere, $\partial B$) results in a uniform surface mass density. The gravitational potential outside the ball is identical for both the original solid ball and the swept-out surface mass.

In electrostatics, the method of image charges is an example of "reverse" balayage. Consider a point charge $q$ located at a distance $d$ from an infinite, grounded conducting plane. The effect of the charges on the conducting plane can be "reverse balayaged" to a single "image charge" of $-q$ at the mirror image position with respect to the plane.
