= Weakly harmonic function =

In mathematics, a function $f$ is weakly harmonic in a domain $D$ if

$$\int_D f\, \Delta g = 0$$

for all $g$ with compact support in $D$ and continuous second derivatives, where Δ is the Laplacian. This is the same notion as a weak derivative, however, a function can have a weak derivative and not be differentiable. In this case, we have the somewhat surprising result that a function is weakly harmonic if and only if it is harmonic. Thus weakly harmonic is actually equivalent to the seemingly stronger harmonic condition.

== See also ==
- Weak solution
- Weyl's lemma
