= Hilbert's twentieth problem =

Can all boundary value problems be solved

Hilbert's twentieth problem is one of the 23 Hilbert problems set out in a celebrated list compiled in 1900 by David Hilbert. It asks whether all boundary value problems can be solved (that is, do variational problems with certain boundary conditions have solutions).

== Introduction ==
Hilbert noted that there existed methods for solving partial differential equations where the function's values were given at the boundary, but the problem asked for methods for solving partial differential equations with more complicated conditions on the boundary (e.g., involving derivatives of the function), or for solving calculus of variation problems in more than 1 dimension (for example, minimal surface problems or minimal curvature problems)

== Problem statement ==
The original problem statement in its entirety is as follows:

An important problem closely connected with the foregoing [referring to Hilbert's nineteenth problem] is the question concerning the existence of solutions of partial differential equations when the values on the boundary of the region are prescribed. This problem is solved in the main by the keen methods of H. A. Schwarz, C. Neumann, and Poincaré for the differential equation of the potential. These methods, however, seem to be generally not capable of direct extension to the case where along the boundary there are prescribed either the differential coefficients or any relations between these and the values of the function. Nor can they be extended immediately to the case where the inquiry is not for potential surfaces but, say, for surfaces of least area, or surfaces of constant positive gaussian curvature, which are to pass through a prescribed twisted curve or to stretch over a given ring surface. It is my conviction that it will be possible to prove these existence theorems by means of a general principle whose nature is indicated by Dirichlet's principle. This general principle will then perhaps enable us to approach the question: Has not every regular variation problem a solution, provided certain assumptions regarding the given boundary conditions are satisfied (say that the functions concerned in these boundary conditions are continuous and have in sections one or more derivatives), and provided also if need be that the notion of a solution shall be suitably extended?

== Boundary value problems ==
In the field of differential equations, a boundary value problem is a differential equation together with a set of additional constraints, called the boundary conditions. A solution to a boundary value problem is a solution to the differential equation which also satisfies the boundary conditions.

To be useful in applications, a boundary value problem should be well-posed. This means that given the input to the problem there exists a unique solution, which depends continuously on the input. Much theoretical work in the field of partial differential equations is devoted to proving that boundary value problems arising from scientific and engineering applications are in fact well-posed.
