= Weyl's lemma (Laplace equation) =

Mathematical equation

In mathematics, Weyl's lemma, named after Hermann Weyl, states that every weak solution of Laplace's equation is a smooth solution. This contrasts with the wave equation, for example, which has weak solutions that are not smooth solutions. Weyl's lemma is a special case of elliptic or hypoelliptic regularity.

== Statement of the lemma ==
Let $\Omega$ be an open subset of $n$-dimensional Euclidean space $\mathbb{R}^{n}$, and let $\Delta$ denote the usual Laplace operator. Weyl's lemma states that if a locally integrable function $u \in L_{\mathrm{loc}}^{1}(\Omega)$ is a weak solution of Laplace's equation, in the sense that

$$\int_\Omega u(x) \, \Delta \varphi (x) \, dx = 0$$

for every test function (smooth function with compact support) $\varphi \in C_c^\infty(\Omega)$, then (up to redefinition on a set of measure zero) $u \in C^{\infty}(\Omega)$ is smooth and satisfies $\Delta u = 0$ pointwise in $\Omega$.

This result implies the interior regularity of harmonic functions in $\Omega$, but it does not say anything about their regularity on the boundary $\partial\Omega$.

== Idea of the proof ==
To prove Weyl's lemma, one convolves the function $u$ with an appropriate mollifier $\varphi_\varepsilon$ and shows that the mollification $u_\varepsilon = \varphi_\varepsilon\ast u$ satisfies Laplace's equation, which implies that $u_\varepsilon$ has the mean value property. Taking the limit as $\varepsilon\to 0$ and using the properties of mollifiers, one finds that $u$ also has the mean value property, which implies that it is a smooth solution of Laplace's equation. Alternative proofs use the smoothness of the fundamental solution of the Laplacian or suitable a priori elliptic estimates.

Proof

Let $\left(\rho_{\varepsilon}\right)_{\varepsilon>0}$ be the standard mollifier.

Fix a compact set $\Omega^{\prime} \Subset \Omega$ and put $\varepsilon_0=\operatorname{dist}\left(\Omega^{\prime}, \partial \Omega\right)$ be the distance between $\Omega^{\prime}$ and the boundary of $\Omega$.

For each $x \in \Omega^{\prime}$ and $\varepsilon \in\left(0, \varepsilon_0\right)$ the function

$$y \longmapsto \rho_{\varepsilon}(x-y)$$

belongs to test functions $\mathcal{D}(\Omega)$ and so we may consider

$$\left\langle u, \rho_{\varepsilon}(x-\cdot)\right\rangle$$

We assert that it is independent of $\varepsilon \in\left(0, \varepsilon_0\right)$. To prove it we calculate $\frac{\mathrm{d}}{\mathrm{d} \varepsilon} \rho_{\varepsilon}(x-y)$ for $x, y \in \mathbb{R}^n$.

Recall that

$$\rho_{\varepsilon}(x-y)=\varepsilon^{-n} \rho\left(\frac{x-y}{\varepsilon}\right)$$

where the standard mollifier kernel $\rho$ on $\mathbb{R}^n$ was defined at Mollifier#Concrete_example. If we put

$$\theta(t)= \begin{cases}\frac{1}{c_n} \mathrm{e}^{\frac{1}{t-1}} & \text { if } t<1, \\ 0 & \text { if } t \geqslant 1,\end{cases}$$

then $\rho(x)=\theta\left(|x|^2\right)$.

Clearly $\theta \in \mathrm{C}^{\infty}(\mathbb{R})$ satisfies $\theta(t)=0$ for $t \geqslant 1$. Now calculate

$$\begin{aligned}
\frac{\mathrm{d}}{\mathrm{d} \varepsilon}\left(\varepsilon^{-n} \rho\left(\frac{x-y}{\varepsilon}\right)\right) & =-n \varepsilon^{-n-1} \rho\left(\frac{x-y}{\varepsilon}\right)-\varepsilon^{-n} \nabla \rho\left(\frac{x-y}{\varepsilon}\right) \cdot \frac{x-y}{\varepsilon^2} \\
& =-\frac{1}{\varepsilon^{n+1}}\left(n \rho\left(\frac{x-y}{\varepsilon}\right)+\nabla \rho\left(\frac{x-y}{\varepsilon}\right) \cdot \frac{x-y}{\varepsilon}\right)
\end{aligned}$$

Put $K(x)=-n \rho(x)-\nabla \rho(x) \cdot x$ so that

$$\frac{\mathrm{d}}{\mathrm{d} \varepsilon}\left(\varepsilon^{-n} \rho\left(\frac{x-y}{\varepsilon}\right)\right)=\frac{1}{\varepsilon^{n+1}} K\left(\frac{x-y}{\varepsilon}\right) .$$

In terms of $\rho(x)=\theta\left(|x|^2\right)$ we get

$$K(x)=-\operatorname{div}(\rho(x) x)=-\operatorname{div}\left(\theta\left(|x|^2\right) x\right)$$

and if we set

$$\Theta(t)=\frac{1}{2} \int_t^{\infty} \theta(s) \mathrm{d} s$$

then $\Theta \in \mathrm{C}^{\infty}(\mathbb{R})$ with $\Theta(t)=0$ for $t \geqslant 1$, and $\Theta^{\prime}(t)=-\frac{1}{2} \theta(t)$. Consequently

$$-\theta\left(|x|^2\right) x=\nabla\left(\Theta\left(|x|^2\right)\right)$$

and so $K(x)=\operatorname{div} \nabla\left(\Theta\left(|x|^2\right)\right)=(\Delta \Phi)(x)$, where $\Phi(x)=\Theta\left(|x|^2\right)$. Observe that $\Phi \in \mathcal{D}\left(\overline{B_1(0)}\right)$, and

$$\begin{aligned}
-\frac{1}{\varepsilon^{n+1}}\left(n \rho\left(\frac{x-y}{\varepsilon}\right)+\nabla \rho\left(\frac{x-y}{\varepsilon}\right) \cdot \frac{x-y}{\varepsilon}\right) & =\frac{1}{\varepsilon^{n+1}} \Delta_y\left(\Phi\left(\frac{x-y}{\varepsilon}\right)\right) \\
& =\Delta_y\left(\varepsilon^{1-n} \Phi\left(\frac{x-y}{\varepsilon}\right)\right) .
\end{aligned}$$

Here $y \mapsto \varepsilon^{1-n} \Phi\left(\frac{x-y}{\varepsilon}\right)$ is supported in $\overline{B_{\varepsilon}(x)} \subset \Omega$, and so by assumption

$$\left\langle u, \Delta_y\left(\varepsilon^{1-n} \Phi\left(\frac{x-y}{\varepsilon}\right)\right)\right\rangle=0$$.

Now by considering difference quotients we see that

$$\frac{\mathrm{d}}{\mathrm{d} \varepsilon}\left\langle u, \rho_{\varepsilon}(x-\cdot)\right\rangle=\left\langle u, \frac{\mathrm{d}}{\mathrm{d} \varepsilon} \rho_{\varepsilon}(x-\cdot)\right\rangle$$.

Indeed, for $\varepsilon, \varepsilon^{\prime}>0$ we have

$$\begin{aligned}
\frac{\rho_{\varepsilon+\varepsilon^{\prime}}(x-y)-\rho_{\varepsilon}(x-y)}{\varepsilon^{\prime}} & \stackrel{\mathrm{FTC}}{=} \int_0^1 \frac{\mathrm{d}}{\mathrm{d} t} \rho_{\varepsilon+t \varepsilon^{\prime}}(x-y) \mathrm{d} t \\
& \left.\underset{\varepsilon^{\prime} \searrow0}{\longrightarrow} \frac{\mathrm{d}}{\mathrm{d} s}\right|_{s=\varepsilon} \rho_s(x-y)
\end{aligned}$$

in $\mathcal{D}^{\prime}(\Omega)$ with respect to $y$, provided $x \in \Omega^{\prime}$ and $0<\varepsilon<\varepsilon_0$ (since we may differentiate both sides with respect to $y)$. But then $\frac{\mathrm{d}}{\mathrm{d} \varepsilon}\left\langle u, \rho_{\varepsilon}(x-\cdot)\right\rangle=0$, and so $\left\langle u, \rho_{\varepsilon}(x-\cdot)\right\rangle=\left\langle u, \rho_{\varepsilon_1}(x-\cdot)\right\rangle$ for all $\varepsilon \in\left(0, \varepsilon_0\right)$, where $\varepsilon_1 \in\left(0, \varepsilon_0\right)$. Now let $\varphi \in \mathcal{D}\left(\Omega^{\prime}\right)$. Then, by the usual trick when convolving distributions with test functions,

$$\begin{aligned}
\int_{\Omega^{\prime}}\left\langle u, \rho_{\varepsilon}(x-\cdot)\right\rangle \varphi(x) \mathrm{d} x & =\left\langle u, \int_{\Omega^{\prime}} \rho_{\varepsilon}(x-\cdot) \varphi(x) \mathrm{d} x\right\rangle \\
& =\left\langle u, \rho_{\varepsilon} * \varphi\right\rangle
\end{aligned}$$

and so for $\varepsilon \in\left(0, \varepsilon_1\right)$ we have

$$\left\langle u, \rho_{\varepsilon} * \varphi\right\rangle=\int_{\Omega^{\prime}}\left\langle u, \rho_{\varepsilon_1}(x-\cdot)\right\rangle \varphi(x) \mathrm{d} x$$.

Hence, as $\rho_{\varepsilon} * \varphi \rightarrow \varphi$ in $\mathcal{D}(\Omega)$ as $\varepsilon \searrow 0$, we get

$$\langle u, \varphi\rangle=\int_{\Omega^{\prime}}\left\langle u, \rho_{\varepsilon_1}(x-\cdot)\right\rangle \varphi(x) \mathrm{d} x$$.

Consequently $\left.u\right|_{\Omega^{\prime}} \in \mathrm{C}^{\infty}\left(\Omega^{\prime}\right)$, and since $\Omega^{\prime}$ was arbitrary, we are done.

== Generalization to distributions ==
More generally, the same result holds for every distributional solution of Laplace's equation: If $T\in D'(\Omega)$ satisfies $\langle T, \Delta \varphi\rangle = 0$ for every $\varphi\in C_c^\infty(\Omega)$, then $T$ is a regular distribution associated with a smooth solution $u\in C^\infty(\Omega)$ of Laplace's equation.

== Connection with hypoellipticity ==
Weyl's lemma follows from more general results concerning the regularity properties of elliptic or hypoelliptic operators. A linear partial differential operator $P$ with smooth coefficients is hypoelliptic if the singular support of $P u$ is equal to the singular support of $u$ for every distribution $u$. The Laplace operator is hypoelliptic, so if $\Delta u = 0$, then the singular support of $u$ is empty since the singular support of $0$ is empty, meaning that $u\in C^\infty(\Omega)$. In fact, since the Laplacian is elliptic, a stronger result is true, and solutions of $\Delta u = 0$ are real-analytic.
