= 6-sphere coordinates =

3D coordinate system used in mathematics

In mathematics, 6-sphere coordinates are a coordinate system for three-dimensional space obtained by inverting the 3D Cartesian coordinates across the unit 2-sphere $x^2+y^2+z^2=1$. They are so named because the loci where one coordinate is constant form spheres tangent to the origin from one of six sides (depending on which coordinate is held constant and whether its value is positive or negative). This coordinate system exists independently from and has no relation to the 6-sphere. The three coordinates are

$$u = \frac{x}{x^2+y^2+z^2},\quad v = \frac{y}{x^2+y^2+z^2},\quad w = \frac{z}{x^2+y^2+z^2}.$$

Since inversion is an involution, the equations for x, y, and z in terms of u, v, and w are similar:

$$x = \frac{u}{u^2+v^2+w^2},\quad y = \frac{v}{u^2+v^2+w^2},\quad z = \frac{w}{u^2+v^2+w^2}.$$

This coordinate system is $R$-separable for the 3-variable Laplace equation.

== See also ==
- Multiplicative inverse (for 1-dimensional version)
