= Separable partial differential equation =

A separable partial differential equation can be broken into a set of equations of lower dimensionality (fewer independent variables) by a method of separation of variables. It generally relies upon the problem having some special form or symmetry. In this way, the partial differential equation (PDE) can be solved by solving a set of simpler PDEs, or even ordinary differential equations (ODEs) if the problem can be broken down into one-dimensional equations.

The most common form of separation of variables is simple separation of variables. A solution is obtained by assuming a solution of the form given by a product of functions of each individual coordinate. There is a special form of separation of variables called $R$-separation of variables which is accomplished by writing the solution as a particular fixed function of the coordinates multiplied by a product of functions of each individual coordinate. Laplace's equation on ${\mathbb R}^n$ is an example of a partial differential equation that admits solutions through $R$-separation of variables; in the three-dimensional case this uses 6-sphere coordinates.

(This should not be confused with the case of a separable ODE, which refers to a somewhat different class of problems that can be broken into a pair of integrals; see separation of variables.)

== Example ==
For example, consider the time-independent Schrödinger equation

$$[-\nabla^2 + V(\mathbf{x})]\psi(\mathbf{x}) = E\psi(\mathbf{x})$$

for the function $\psi(\mathbf{x})$ (in dimensionless units, for simplicity). (Equivalently, consider the inhomogeneous Helmholtz equation.) If the function $V(\mathbf{x})$ in three dimensions is of the form

$$V(x_1,x_2,x_3) = V_1(x_1) + V_2(x_2) + V_3(x_3),$$

then it turns out that the problem can be separated into three one-dimensional ODEs for functions $\psi_1(x_1)$, $\psi_2(x_2)$, and $\psi_3(x_3)$, and the final solution can be written as $\psi(\mathbf{x}) = \psi_1(x_1) \cdot \psi_2(x_2) \cdot \psi_3(x_3)$. (More generally, the separable cases of the Schrödinger equation were enumerated by Eisenhart in 1948.)
