= Quadrature domains =

In the branch of mathematics called potential theory, a quadrature domain in two dimensional real Euclidean space is a domain D (an open connected set) together with a finite subset {z_{1}, …, z_{k}} of D such that, for every function u harmonic and integrable over D with respect to area measure, the integral of u with respect to this measure is given by a "quadrature formula"; that is,

$$\iint_D u\, dx dy = \sum_{j=1}^k c_j u(z_j),$$

where the c_{j} are nonzero complex constants independent of u.

The most obvious example is when D is a circular disk: here k = 1, z_{1} is the center of the circle, and c_{1} equals the area of D. That quadrature formula expresses the mean value property of harmonic functions with respect to disks.

It is known that quadrature domains exist for all values of k. There is an analogous definition of quadrature domains in Euclidean space of dimension d larger than 2. There is also an alternative, electrostatic interpretation of quadrature domains: a domain D is a quadrature domain if a uniform distribution of electric charge on D creates the same electrostatic field outside D as does a k-tuple of point charges at the points z_{1}, …, z_{k}.

Quadrature domains and numerous generalizations thereof (e.g., replace area measure by length measure on the boundary of D) have in recent years been encountered in various connections such as inverse problems of Newtonian gravitation, Hele-Shaw flows of viscous fluids, and purely mathematical isoperimetric problems, and interest in them seems to be steadily growing. They were the subject of an international conference at the University of California at Santa Barbara in 2003 and the state of the art as of that date can be seen in the proceedings of that conference, published by Birkhäuser Verlag.
