= Laplace operator =

Differential operator in mathematics

In mathematics, the Laplace operator or Laplacian is a differential operator given by the divergence of the gradient of a scalar function on Euclidean space. It is usually denoted by the symbols $\nabla\cdot\nabla$, $\nabla^2$ (where $\nabla$ is the nabla operator), or $\Delta$. In a Cartesian coordinate system, the Laplacian is given by the sum of second partial derivatives of the function with respect to each independent variable. In other coordinate systems, such as cylindrical and spherical coordinates, the Laplacian also has a useful form. Informally, the Laplacian Δf (p) of a function f at a point p measures by how much the average value of f over small spheres or balls centered at p deviates from f (p).

The Laplace operator is named after the French mathematician Pierre-Simon de Laplace (1749–1827), who first applied the operator to the study of celestial mechanics: the Laplacian of the gravitational potential due to a given mass density distribution is a constant multiple of that density distribution. Solutions of Laplace's equation Δf = 0 are called harmonic functions and represent the possible gravitational potentials in regions of vacuum.

The Laplacian occurs in many differential equations describing physical phenomena. Poisson's equation describes electric and gravitational potentials; the diffusion equation describes heat and fluid flow; the wave equation describes wave propagation; and the Schrödinger equation describes the wave function in quantum mechanics. In image processing and computer vision, the Laplacian operator has been used for various tasks, such as blob and edge detection. The Laplacian is the simplest elliptic operator and is at the core of Hodge theory as well as the results of de Rham cohomology. It is also essentially the infinitesimal generator of standard Brownian motion on $\mathbf R^n$.

== Definition ==
The Laplace operator is a second-order differential operator in the n-dimensional Euclidean space, defined as the divergence ($\nabla \cdot$) of the gradient ($\nabla f$). Thus if $f$ is a twice-differentiable real-valued function, then the Laplacian of $f$ is the real-valued function defined by:

$$\Delta f = \nabla^2 f = \nabla \cdot \nabla f ,$$	1

where the latter notations derive from formally writing:
$$\nabla  = \left ( \frac{\partial }{\partial x_1} , \ldots , \frac{\partial }{\partial x_n} \right ).$$
Explicitly, the Laplacian of f is thus the sum of all the unmixed second partial derivatives in the Cartesian coordinates x_{i}:

$$\Delta f = \sum_{i=1}^n \frac {\partial^2 f}{\partial x^2_i}$$	2

As a second-order differential operator, the Laplace operator maps C^{k} functions to C^{k−2} functions for k ≥ 2. It is a linear operator Δ : C^{k}(R^{n}) → C^{k−2}(R^{n}), or more generally, an operator Δ : C^{k}(Ω) → C^{k−2}(Ω) for any open set Ω ⊆ R^{n}.

Alternatively, the Laplace operator can be defined as:
$$\nabla^2 f(\vec{x}) = \lim_{R \rightarrow 0} \frac{2n}{R^2} (f_{\text{shell}_R} - f(\vec{x})) = \lim_{R \rightarrow 0} \frac{2n}{A_{n-1} R^{1+n}} \int_{\text{shell}_R} f(\vec{r}) - f(\vec{x}) d r^{n-1}$$
where $n$ is the dimension of the space, $f_{\text{shell}_R}$ is the average value of $f$ on the surface of an n-sphere of radius $R$, $\textstyle \int_{\text{shell}_R} f(\vec{r}) d r^{n-1}$ is the surface integral over an n-sphere of radius $R$, and $A_{n-1}$ is the hypervolume of the boundary of a unit n-sphere.

== Sign conventions ==
There is no single standard sign convention for the Laplace operator. In Euclidean coordinates, one common convention is
$$\Delta=\nabla\cdot\nabla=\sum_{j=1}^n \frac{\partial^2}{\partial x_j^2},$$
so that for every smooth compactly supported function $\varphi$,
$$\int_{\mathbf R^n}\overline{\varphi(x)}\,\Delta\varphi(x)\,dx
=
-\int_{\mathbf R^n} |\nabla \varphi(x)|^2\,dx,$$
and hence $\Delta$ is negative semidefinite on $L^2$.

Another common convention inserts a minus sign and defines instead
$$\Delta=-\nabla\cdot\nabla=-\sum_{j=1}^n \frac{\partial^2}{\partial x_j^2},$$
so that the Laplacian is nonnegative.

Both conventions occur in the literature, and authors usually state explicitly which one they are using. In this article, unless otherwise noted, $\Delta$ denotes the Euclidean Laplacian
$$\Delta=\nabla\cdot\nabla=\sum_{j=1}^n \frac{\partial^2}{\partial x_j^2}.$$

== Motivation ==
=== Diffusion ===
In the physical theory of diffusion, the Laplace operator arises naturally in the mathematical description of equilibrium. Specifically, if u is the density at equilibrium of some quantity such as a chemical concentration, then the net flux of u through the boundary ∂V (also called S) of any smooth region V is zero, provided there is no source or sink within V:
$$\int_{S} \nabla u \cdot \mathbf{n}\, dS = 0,$$
where n is the outward unit normal to the boundary of V. By the divergence theorem,
$$\int_V \operatorname{div} \nabla u\, dV = \int_{S} \nabla u \cdot \mathbf{n}\, dS = 0.$$

Since this holds for all smooth regions V, one can show that it implies:
$$\operatorname{div} \nabla u = \Delta u = 0.$$
The left-hand side of this equation is the Laplace operator, and the entire equation Δu = 0 is known as Laplace's equation. Solutions of the Laplace equation, i.e. functions whose Laplacian is identically zero, thus represent possible equilibrium densities under diffusion.

The Laplace operator itself has a physical interpretation for non-equilibrium diffusion as the extent to which a point represents a source or sink of chemical concentration, in a sense made precise by the diffusion equation. This interpretation of the Laplacian is also explained by the following fact about averages.

=== Averages ===
Given a twice continuously differentiable function $f : \R^n \to \R$ and a point $p\in\R^n$, the average value of $f$ over the ball with radius $h$ centered at $p$ is:
$$\overline{f}_B(p,h)=f(p)+\frac{\Delta f(p)}{2(n+2)} h^2 +o(h^2) \quad\text{for}\;\; h\to 0$$

Similarly, the average value of $f$ over the sphere (the boundary of a ball) with radius $h$ centered at $p$ is:
$$\overline{f}_S(p,h)=f(p)+\frac{\Delta f(p)}{2n} h^2 +o(h^2) \quad\text{for}\;\; h\to 0.$$

=== Density associated with a potential ===
If φ denotes the electrostatic potential associated to a charge distribution q, then the charge distribution itself is given by the negative of the Laplacian of φ:
$$q = -\varepsilon_0 \Delta\varphi,$$
where ε_{0} is the electric constant.

This is a consequence of Gauss's law. Indeed, if V is any smooth region with boundary ∂V, then by Gauss's law the flux of the electrostatic field E across the boundary is proportional to the charge enclosed:
$$\int_{\partial V} \mathbf{E}\cdot \mathbf{n}\, dS = \int_V \operatorname{div}\mathbf{E}\,dV=\frac1{\varepsilon_0}\int_V q\,dV.$$
where the first equality is due to the divergence theorem. Since the electrostatic field is the (negative) gradient of the potential, this gives:
$$-\int_V \operatorname{div}(\operatorname{grad}\varphi)\,dV = \frac1{\varepsilon_0} \int_V q\,dV.$$

Since this holds for all regions V, we must have
$$\operatorname{div}(\operatorname{grad}\varphi) = -\frac 1 {\varepsilon_0}q$$

The same approach implies that the negative of the Laplacian of the gravitational potential is the mass distribution. Often the charge (or mass) distribution are given, and the associated potential is unknown. Finding the potential function subject to suitable boundary conditions is equivalent to solving Poisson's equation.

=== Energy minimization ===
Another motivation for the Laplacian appearing in physics is that solutions to Δf = 0 in a region U are functions that make the Dirichlet energy functional stationary:
$$E(f) = \frac{1}{2} \int_U \lVert \nabla f \rVert^2 \,dx.$$

To see this, suppose f : U → R is a function, and u : U → R is a function that vanishes on the boundary of U. Then:
$$\left. \frac{d}{d\varepsilon}\right|_{\varepsilon = 0} E(f+\varepsilon u) = \int_U \nabla f \cdot \nabla u \, dx = -\int_U u \, \Delta f\, dx$$
where the last equality follows using Green's first identity. This calculation shows that if Δf = 0, then E is stationary around f. Conversely, if E is stationary around f, then Δf = 0 by the fundamental lemma of calculus of variations.

== Coordinate expressions ==
=== Two dimensions ===
The Laplace operator in two dimensions is given by:

In Cartesian coordinates,
$$\Delta f = \frac{\partial^2 f}{\partial x^2} + \frac{\partial^2 f}{\partial y^2}$$
where x and y are the standard Cartesian coordinates of the xy-plane.

In polar coordinates,
$$\begin{align}
\Delta f &= \frac{1}{r} \frac{\partial}{\partial r} \left( r \frac{\partial f}{\partial r} \right) + \frac{1}{r^2} \frac{\partial^2 f}{\partial \theta^2} \\
&= \frac{\partial^2 f}{\partial r^2} + \frac{1}{r} \frac{\partial f}{\partial r} + \frac{1}{r^2} \frac{\partial^2 f}{\partial \theta^2},
\end{align}$$
where r represents the radial distance and θ the angle.

=== Three dimensions ===
In three dimensions, it is common to work with the Laplacian in a variety of different coordinate systems.

In Cartesian coordinates,
$$\Delta f = \frac{\partial^2 f}{\partial x^2} + \frac{\partial^2 f}{\partial y^2} + \frac{\partial^2 f}{\partial z^2}.$$

In cylindrical coordinates,
$$\Delta f = \frac{1}{\rho} \frac{\partial}{\partial \rho} \left(\rho \frac{\partial f}{\partial \rho} \right) + \frac{1}{\rho^2} \frac{\partial^2 f}{\partial \varphi^2} + \frac{\partial^2 f}{\partial z^2 },$$
where $\rho$ represents the radial distance, φ the azimuth angle and z the height.

In spherical coordinates:
$$\Delta f = \frac{1}{r^2} \frac{\partial}{\partial r} \left(r^2 \frac{\partial f}{\partial r} \right) + \frac{1}{r^2 \sin \theta} \frac{\partial}{\partial \theta} \left(\sin \theta \frac{\partial f}{\partial \theta} \right) + \frac{1}{r^2 \sin^2 \theta} \frac{\partial^2 f}{\partial \varphi^2},$$
or
$$\Delta f = \frac{1}{r} \frac{\partial^2}{\partial r^2} (r f) + \frac{1}{r^2 \sin \theta} \frac{\partial}{\partial \theta} \left(\sin \theta \frac{\partial f}{\partial \theta} \right) + \frac{1}{r^2 \sin^2 \theta} \frac{\partial^2 f}{\partial \varphi^2},$$
by expanding the first and second term, these expressions read
$$\Delta f = \frac{\partial^2 f}{\partial r^2} + \frac{2}{r}\frac{\partial f}{\partial r}+\frac{1}{r^2 \sin \theta} \left(\cos \theta \frac{\partial f}{\partial \theta} + \sin \theta \frac{\partial^2 f}{\partial \theta^2} \right) + \frac{1}{r^2 \sin^2 \theta} \frac{\partial^2 f}{\partial \varphi^2},$$
where φ represents the azimuthal angle and θ the zenith angle or co-latitude. In particular, the above is equivalent to $\Delta f = \frac{\partial^2 f}{\partial r^2} + \frac{2}{r}\frac{\partial f}{\partial r} + \frac{1}{r^2}\Delta_{S^2} f ,$ where $\Delta_{S^2}f$ is the Laplace-Beltrami operator on the unit sphere.

In general curvilinear coordinates (ξ^{1}, ξ^{2}, ξ^{3}):
$$\Delta = \nabla \xi^m \cdot \nabla \xi^n \frac{\partial^2}{\partial \xi^m \, \partial \xi^n} + \nabla^2 \xi^m \frac{\partial}{\partial \xi^m } = g^{mn} \left(\frac{\partial^2}{\partial\xi^m \, \partial\xi^n} - \Gamma^{l}_{mn}\frac{\partial}{\partial\xi^l} \right),$$
where summation over the repeated indices is implied, g^{mn} is the inverse metric tensor and Γ^{l} _{mn} are the Christoffel symbols for the selected coordinates.

=== N dimensions ===
In arbitrary curvilinear coordinates $(\xi^1,\dots,\xi^N)$ on $\mathbf R^N$, the Laplacian can be written in terms of the inverse metric tensor $g^{ij}$ as
$$\Delta f
=
\frac{1}{\sqrt{|g|}}
\frac{\partial}{\partial \xi^i}
\left(
\sqrt{|g|}\,g^{ij}\frac{\partial f}{\partial \xi^j}
\right),
\qquad |g|=\det(g_{ij}).$$
This is the Euclidean special case of the Laplace–Beltrami operator.

In spherical coordinates on $\mathbf R^N$, write
$$x=r\omega, \qquad r=|x|>0,\quad \omega\in S^{N-1}$$
where $S^{N-1}$ is the unit (N–1)-sphere in $\mathbf R^N.$ Then the Laplacian decomposes into radial and angular parts:
$$\Delta f
=
\frac{\partial^2 f}{\partial r^2}
+
\frac{N-1}{r}\frac{\partial f}{\partial r}
+
\frac{1}{r^2}\Delta_{S^{N-1}}f,$$
or equivalently
$$\Delta f
=
\frac{1}{r^{N-1}}\frac{\partial}{\partial r}
\left(r^{N-1}\frac{\partial f}{\partial r}\right)
+
\frac{1}{r^2}\Delta_{S^{N-1}}f,$$
where $\Delta_{S^{N-1}}$ is the Laplace–Beltrami operator on $S^{N-1}$, often called the spherical Laplacian.

This decomposition is the starting point for separation of variables in Laplace's equation. If one seeks solutions of the form
$$u(r,\omega)=R(r)Y(\omega),$$
then the angular factor must satisfy the eigenvalue equation
$$-\Delta_{S^{N-1}}Y=\lambda Y.$$
The eigenvalues are
$$\lambda_\ell=\ell(\ell+N-2), \qquad \ell=0,1,2,\dots,$$
and the corresponding eigenfunctions are the spherical harmonics of degree $\ell$ on $S^{N-1}$.

Substituting $u(r,\omega)=R(r)Y(\omega)$ into $\Delta u=0$ gives the radial equation
$$r^2R''(r)+(N-1)rR'(r)-\ell(\ell+N-2)R(r)=0.$$
For $N\ge 3$, its solutions are
$$R(r)=Ar^\ell+Br^{-\ell-(N-2)},$$
while in the exceptional case $N=2$ and $\ell=0$ one obtains
$$R(r)=A+B\log r.$$
These give the classical solid harmonics.

In particular, if $f(x)=F(r)$ is radial, then the angular term vanishes and
$$\Delta f
=
F''(r)+\frac{N-1}{r}F'(r)
=
\frac{1}{r^{N-1}}\frac{d}{dr}\left(r^{N-1}F'(r)\right).$$
Thus every radial harmonic function on an annulus in $\mathbf R^N$ has the form
$$F(r)=
\begin{cases}
A+Br^{2-N}, & N\ne 2,\\[4pt]
A+B\log r, & N=2.
\end{cases}$$

As a consequence, the spherical Laplacian of a function on $S^{N-1}$ may be computed by extending the function to $\mathbf R^N\setminus\{0\}$ so that it is constant along rays (that is, homogeneous of degree $0$) and then applying the ordinary Laplacian.

== Euclidean invariance ==
The Laplacian is equivariant under pullback by every Euclidean transformation. More precisely, if
$$g(x)=Ux+a$$
is a Euclidean isometry of $\mathbf R^n$, with $U\in O(n)$ and $a\in \mathbf R^n$, then for every $f\in C^2(\mathbf R^n)$,
$$\Delta(f\circ g)=(\Delta f)\circ g.$$
Thus the Laplacian commutes with translations and with orthogonal transformations, hence in particular with rotations and reflections.

In two dimensions, this says that for every angle $\theta$ and every translation vector $(a,b)$,
$$\Delta\bigl(f(x\cos\theta-y\sin\theta+a,\;x\sin\theta+y\cos\theta+b)\bigr)
=
(\Delta f)(x\cos\theta-y\sin\theta+a,\;x\sin\theta+y\cos\theta+b).$$

Equivalently, $\Delta$ is invariant under the natural action of the Euclidean group $E(n)=O(n)\ltimes \mathbf R^n$ on functions on $\mathbf R^n$.

More generally, among scalar linear differential operators on $\mathbf R^n$ with constant coefficients, those that commute with all Euclidean isometries are exactly the polynomial expressions in the Laplacian:
$$P(\Delta)=a_0+a_1\Delta+\cdots+a_m\Delta^m.$$
In this sense, the Laplacian generates the algebra of Euclidean-invariant scalar constant-coefficient differential operators.

From the viewpoint of Lie theory, the rotational invariance of the Laplacian is reflected in the action of the orthogonal group $O(n)$. In particular, the angular part of the Euclidean Laplacian is, up to sign convention, the quadratic Casimir operator of the rotation group. In three dimensions this appears in the spherical-coordinate decomposition
$$\Delta_{\mathbf R^3}
=
\frac{1}{r}\frac{\partial^2}{\partial r^2}(r\cdot)-\frac{J^2}{r^2}
=
\frac{\partial^2}{\partial r^2}+\frac{2}{r}\frac{\partial}{\partial r}+\frac{1}{r^2}\Delta_{S^2},$$
where $J^2$ is the quadratic Casimir of $\mathfrak{so}(3)$; equivalently, $\Delta_{S^2}=-J^2$ up to convention.

More generally, on homogeneous spaces such as spheres, the Laplace–Beltrami operator is obtained from the quadratic Casimir of the acting Lie group, and on a compact Lie group with a bi-invariant metric the Laplacian is the image of the Casimir element of the Lie algebra.

== Properties ==
The Laplace operator has several basic structural properties that make it the prototype of an elliptic operator.

=== Linearity and ellipticity ===
The Laplace operator is linear:
$$\Delta(af+bg)=a\,\Delta f+b\,\Delta g$$
for all functions $f$ and $g$ and scalars $a$ and $b$.

For the sign convention used in this article,
$$\Delta=\sum_{j=1}^n \frac{\partial^2}{\partial x_j^2},$$
the principal symbol of $\Delta$ is
$$\sigma_2(\Delta)(\xi)=-|\xi|^2,$$
which is nonzero for every $\xi \ne 0$. Thus $\Delta$ is an elliptic differential operator.

=== Green's identities and formal self-adjointness ===
If $\Omega \subset \mathbf R^n$ is a bounded $C^1$ domain and $u,v\in C^2(\bar\Omega)$, then Green's identities give
$$\int_\Omega u\,\Delta v\,dx
=
-\int_\Omega \nabla u\cdot \nabla v\,dx
+
\int_{\partial\Omega} u\,\frac{\partial v}{\partial \nu}\,dS,$$
and
$$\int_\Omega u\,\Delta v\,dx
=
\int_\Omega v\,\Delta u\,dx
+
\int_{\partial\Omega}\left(u\frac{\partial v}{\partial \nu}-v\frac{\partial u}{\partial \nu}\right)\,dS.$$
In particular, if the boundary term vanishes (for example, for compactly supported functions), then
$$\int_\Omega u\,\Delta v\,dx=\int_\Omega v\,\Delta u\,dx,$$
so the Laplacian is formally self-adjoint. Taking $u=v$ gives the energy identity
$$\int_\Omega u\,\Delta u\,dx
=
-\int_\Omega |\nabla u|^2\,dx
+
\int_{\partial\Omega} u\,\frac{\partial u}{\partial \nu}\,dS,$$
which underlies uniqueness results for boundary value problems.

=== Harmonic, subharmonic, and superharmonic functions ===
A twice continuously differentiable function $u$ is called harmonic if $\Delta u=0$, subharmonic if $\Delta u\ge 0$, and superharmonic if $\Delta u\le 0$.

If $u$ is harmonic in an open set $\Omega$ and $B_r(x)\subset \Omega$, then $u(x)$ equals both the average of $u$ over the ball $B_r(x)$ and the average of $u$ over the sphere $\partial B_r(x)$. This is the mean value property for harmonic functions.

A nonconstant harmonic function cannot attain an interior maximum or minimum. Consequently, if $\Omega$ is bounded and $u\in C^2(\Omega)\cap C(\bar\Omega)$ is harmonic, then
$$\max_{\bar{\Omega}} u = \max_{\partial\Omega} u,
\qquad
\min_{\bar{\Omega}} u = \min_{\partial\Omega} u.$$
These are the maximum principle and minimum principle for harmonic functions.

=== Regularity ===
Because the Laplacian is elliptic, solutions of equations involving $\Delta$ are more regular than might initially be assumed. In particular, if $\Delta u$ is locally square-integrable, then $u$ is locally in the Sobolev space $H^2$. In particular, harmonic functions are smooth, and in fact real analytic. More generally, Weyl's lemma states that if $u$ is a distributional solution of $\Delta u=0$, then $u$ is smooth.

The corresponding qualitative theory of harmonic functions, including the maximum principle and Harnack's inequality, is discussed in more detail in Laplace's equation and harmonic function.

== Fourier transform ==
For sufficiently regular functions on $\mathbf{R}^n$, the Laplacian is particularly simple after applying the Fourier transform. With the convention
$$\widehat{f}(\xi)=\int_{\mathbf{R}^n} f(x)e^{-2\pi i x\cdot \xi}\,dx,$$
one has
$$\widehat{\partial_j f}(\xi)=2\pi i \xi_j \widehat{f}(\xi),$$
and therefore
$$\widehat{\Delta f}(\xi)=-4\pi^2 |\xi|^2 \widehat{f}(\xi).$$
Thus the Laplacian is a Fourier multiplier with symbol $-4\pi^2|\xi|^2$.

This representation makes several basic features of the Laplacian transparent. The symbol depends only on $|\xi|$, reflecting the rotational invariance of the operator, and it is nonzero for $\xi\ne 0$, reflecting ellipticity. It also allows one to define functions of the Laplacian by functional calculus: for example, the heat semigroup corresponds to multiplication by
$$e^{-4\pi^2 t|\xi|^2},$$
and, more generally, fractional powers of the Laplacian correspond to multiplication by
$$(4\pi^2|\xi|^2)^{\alpha/2}.$$

Under other common Fourier-transform conventions, the factor $4\pi^2$ is redistributed, but the essential statement remains the same: the Fourier transform diagonalizes the Laplacian.

== Spectral theory ==
The spectral theory of the Laplacian depends strongly on the underlying space and on the boundary conditions imposed.

On $L^2(\mathbf{R}^n)$, the Fourier transform diagonalizes $-\Delta$, turning it into multiplication by $4\pi^2|\xi|^2$. It follows that the spectrum of $-\Delta$ on $\mathbf{R}^n$ is the interval
$$[0,\infty),$$
and that this spectrum is purely continuous rather than discrete. In this setting, plane waves are generalized eigenfunctions of the Laplacian.

If $\Omega\subset \mathbf{R}^n$ is a bounded domain and one imposes boundary conditions such as Dirichlet or Neumann conditions, then the corresponding realization of the Laplacian is a self-adjoint operator with compact resolvent. Consequently its spectrum is discrete: there is a sequence of eigenvalues
$$0\le \lambda_1\le \lambda_2\le \cdots \to \infty$$
(counted with multiplicity), and the associated eigenfunctions form an orthonormal basis of $L^2(\Omega)$. The eigenvalue equation
$$-\Delta u=\lambda u$$
is the Helmholtz equation.

More generally, on a compact Riemannian manifold, the Laplace–Beltrami operator likewise has discrete nonnegative spectrum, and its eigenfunctions form an orthonormal basis of $L^2(M)$. On the round sphere, these eigenfunctions are the spherical harmonics.

=== Fractional Laplacian ===
A nonlocal generalization of the Laplace operator is given by the fractional Laplacian $(-\Delta)^{\alpha/2}$, where $0<\alpha<2$. For Schwartz functions on $\mathbf{R}^n$, it may be defined by its Fourier transform:
$$\mathcal{F}\big((-\Delta)^{\alpha/2}f\big)(\xi)=(4\pi^2|\xi|^2)^{\alpha/2}\widehat{f}(\xi),$$
using the Fourier-transform convention above.

Equivalently, the fractional Laplacian can be defined by a singular integral:
$$(-\Delta)^{\alpha/2}f(x)=c_{n,\alpha}\,\operatorname{PV}\!\int_{\mathbf{R}^n}\frac{f(x)-f(y)}{|x-y|^{n+\alpha}}\,dy,$$
where $\operatorname{PV}$ denotes the Cauchy principal value. Unlike the ordinary Laplacian, this is a nonlocal operator: its value at a point depends on the values of the function on all of $\mathbf{R}^n$.

The inverse of the fractional Laplacian is closely related to the Riesz potential. For $0<\alpha<n$, the Riesz potential of order $\alpha$ is convolution with the kernel $c_{n,\alpha}|x|^{\alpha-n}$:
$$I_\alpha f(x)=c_{n,\alpha}\int_{\mathbf{R}^n}\frac{f(y)}{|x-y|^{n-\alpha}}\,dy.$$
Where both sides are defined, one has
$$(-\Delta)^{\alpha/2}I_\alpha f=f.$$

A related family of operators is given by the Bessel potentials. For $s\in\mathbf{R}$, the Bessel potential operator is defined by
$$\mathcal{F}\big((I-\Delta)^{-s/2}f\big)(\xi)=(1+4\pi^2|\xi|^2)^{-s/2}\widehat{f}(\xi).$$
The associated function spaces are the Bessel potential spaces $H^{s,p}(\mathbf{R}^n)$. Riesz and Bessel potentials are closely related smoothing operators, but Bessel potentials involve $I-\Delta$ rather than $-\Delta$ and therefore behave better at low frequencies.

== Vector Laplacian ==
The vector Laplace operator, also denoted by $\nabla^2$, is a differential operator defined over a vector field. The vector Laplacian is similar to the scalar Laplacian; whereas the scalar Laplacian applies to a scalar field and returns a scalar quantity, the vector Laplacian applies to a vector field, returning a vector quantity. When computed in orthonormal Cartesian coordinates, the returned vector field is equal to the vector field of the scalar Laplacian applied to each vector component.

The vector Laplacian of a vector field $\mathbf{A}$ is defined as
$$\nabla^2 \mathbf{A} = \nabla(\nabla \cdot \mathbf{A}) - \nabla \times (\nabla \times \mathbf{A}).$$
This definition can be seen as the Helmholtz decomposition of the vector Laplacian.

In Cartesian coordinates, this reduces to the much simpler expression
$$\nabla^2 \mathbf{A} = (\nabla^2 A_x, \nabla^2 A_y, \nabla^2 A_z),$$
where $A_x$, $A_y$, and $A_z$ are the components of the vector field $\mathbf{A}$, and $\nabla^2$ just on the left of each vector field component is the (scalar) Laplace operator. This can be seen to be a special case of Lagrange's formula; see Vector triple product.

For expressions of the vector Laplacian in other coordinate systems see Del in cylindrical and spherical coordinates.

=== Generalization ===
The Laplacian of any tensor field $\mathbf{T}$ ("tensor" includes scalar and vector) is defined as the divergence of the gradient of the tensor:
$$\nabla ^2\mathbf{T} = (\nabla \cdot \nabla) \mathbf{T}.$$

For the special case where $\mathbf{T}$ is a scalar (a tensor of degree zero), the Laplacian takes on the familiar form.

If $\mathbf{T}$ is a vector (a tensor of first degree), the gradient is a covariant derivative which results in a tensor of second degree, and the divergence of this is again a vector. The formula for the vector Laplacian above may be used to avoid tensor math and may be shown to be equivalent to the divergence of the Jacobian matrix shown below for the gradient of a vector:
$$\nabla \mathbf{T}= (\nabla T_x, \nabla T_y, \nabla T_z) = \begin{bmatrix}
T_{xx} & T_{xy} & T_{xz} \\
T_{yx} & T_{yy} & T_{yz} \\
T_{zx} & T_{zy} & T_{zz}
\end{bmatrix} ,
\text{ where } T_{uv} \equiv \frac{\partial T_u}{\partial v}.$$

And, in the same manner, a dot product, which evaluates to a vector, of a vector by the gradient of another vector (a tensor of 2nd degree) can be seen as a product of matrices:
$$\mathbf{A} \cdot \nabla \mathbf{B}
= \begin{bmatrix} A_x & A_y & A_z \end{bmatrix} \nabla \mathbf{B}
= \begin{bmatrix} \mathbf{A} \cdot \nabla B_x & \mathbf{A} \cdot \nabla B_y & \mathbf{A} \cdot \nabla B_z \end{bmatrix}.$$
This identity is a coordinate dependent result, and is not general.

=== Use in physics ===
An example of the usage of the vector Laplacian is the Navier-Stokes equations for a Newtonian incompressible flow:
$$\rho \left(\frac{\partial \mathbf{v}}{\partial t}+ ( \mathbf{v} \cdot \nabla ) \mathbf{v}\right)=\rho \mathbf{f}-\nabla p +\mu\left(\nabla ^2 \mathbf{v}\right),$$
where the term with the vector Laplacian of the velocity field $\mu\left(\nabla ^2 \mathbf{v}\right)$ represents the viscous stresses in the fluid.

Another example is the wave equation for the electric field that can be derived from Maxwell's equations in the absence of charges and currents:
$$\nabla^2 \mathbf{E} - \mu_0 \epsilon_0 \frac{\partial^2 \mathbf{E}}{\partial t^2} = 0.$$

This equation can also be written as:
$$\Box\, \mathbf{E} = 0,$$
where
$$\Box\equiv\frac{1}{c^2} \frac{\partial^2}{\partial t^2}-\nabla^2,$$
is the d'Alembertian, used in the Klein–Gordon equation.

== Semigroup and heat kernel ==
The Laplace operator generates the heat semigroup (e^{tΔ})_{t ≥ 0}. If u(x, t) solves the heat equation
$$\partial_t u = \Delta u$$
on $\mathbf{R}^n$ with initial data u(x,0)=f(x), then
$$u(x,t)=(e^{t\Delta}f)(x)=\int_{\mathbf{R}^n}\Gamma_t(x-y)f(y)\,dy,$$
where
$$\Gamma_t(x)=\frac{1}{(4\pi t)^{n/2}}e^{-|x|^2/4t}$$
is the Euclidean heat kernel. The kernels satisfy
$$\Gamma_{s+t}=\Gamma_s * \Gamma_t,$$
equivalently
$$e^{(s+t)\Delta}=e^{s\Delta}e^{t\Delta}.$$
On $L^2(\mathbf{R}^n)$ this is a strongly continuous contraction semigroup whose generator is the Laplacian; more generally, the heat semigroup acts contractively on L^{p} for 1 ≤ p ≤ ∞.

A basic feature of the heat semigroup is its smoothing effect: for every t > 0, the function e^{tΔ}f is smoother than the initial data f. In Euclidean space this is reflected in derivative estimates such as
$$\|\nabla^N e^{t\Delta}f\|_{L^p}\le C_N t^{-N/2}\|f\|_{L^p},$$
and, more generally, in Sobolev estimates of the form
$$\|e^{t\Delta}f\|_{H^{s,p}}\le C\, t^{-s/2}\|f\|_{L^p}.$$
This instantaneous regularization is important in the theory of parabolic partial differential equations and underlies Gaussian smoothing and scale-space methods in image processing.

On bounded domains and on Riemannian manifolds, the same construction defines a heat semigroup whose integral kernel is again called the heat kernel. Its short-time asymptotic behaviour encodes geometric and spectral information about the underlying space.

== Generalizations ==
A version of the Laplacian can be defined wherever the Dirichlet energy functional makes sense, which is the theory of Dirichlet forms. For spaces with additional structure, one can give more explicit descriptions of the Laplacian, as follows.

=== Laplace–Beltrami operator ===
The Laplacian also can be generalized to an elliptic operator called the Laplace–Beltrami operator defined on a Riemannian manifold. The Laplace–Beltrami operator, when applied to a function, is the trace (tr) of the function's Hessian:
$$\Delta f = \operatorname{tr}\big(H(f)\big)$$
where the trace is taken with respect to the inverse of the metric tensor. The Laplace–Beltrami operator also can be generalized to an operator (also called the Laplace–Beltrami operator) which operates on tensor fields, by a similar formula.

Another generalization of the Laplace operator that is available on pseudo-Riemannian manifolds uses the exterior derivative, in terms of which the "geometer's Laplacian" is expressed as
$$\Delta f = \delta d f .$$

Here δ is the codifferential, which can also be expressed in terms of the Hodge star and the exterior derivative. This operator differs in sign from the "analyst's Laplacian" defined above. More generally, the "Hodge" Laplacian is defined on differential forms α by
$$\Delta \alpha = \delta d \alpha + d \delta \alpha .$$

This is known as the Laplace–de Rham operator, which is related to the Laplace–Beltrami operator by the Weitzenböck identity.

=== D'Alembertian ===
The Laplacian can be generalized in certain ways to non-Euclidean spaces, where it may be elliptic, hyperbolic, or ultrahyperbolic.

In Minkowski space the Laplace–Beltrami operator becomes the D'Alembert operator $\Box$ or D'Alembertian:
$$\square = \frac{1}{c^2}\frac{\partial^2}{\partial t^2} - \frac{\partial^2}{\partial x^2} - \frac{\partial^2}{\partial y^2} - \frac{\partial^2}{\partial z^2}.$$

It is the generalization of the Laplace operator in the sense that it is the differential operator which is invariant under the isometry group of the underlying space and it reduces to the Laplace operator if restricted to time-independent functions. The overall sign of the metric here is chosen such that the spatial parts of the operator admit a negative sign, which is the usual convention in high-energy particle physics. The D'Alembert operator is also known as the wave operator because it is the differential operator appearing in the wave equations, and it is also part of the Klein–Gordon equation, which reduces to the wave equation in the massless case.

The additional factor of c in the metric is needed in physics if space and time are measured in different units; a similar factor would be required if, for example, the x direction were measured in meters while the y direction were measured in centimeters. Indeed, theoretical physicists usually work in units such that c = 1 in order to simplify the equation.

The d'Alembert operator generalizes to a hyperbolic operator on pseudo-Riemannian manifolds.

== See also ==
- Laplace–Beltrami operator, generalization to submanifolds in Euclidean space and Riemannian and pseudo-Riemannian manifold.
- The Laplacian in differential geometry.
- The discrete Laplace operator is a finite-difference analog of the continuous Laplacian, defined on graphs and grids.
- The Laplacian is a common operator in image processing and computer vision (see the Laplacian of Gaussian, blob detector, and scale space).
- The list of formulas in Riemannian geometry contains expressions for the Laplacian in terms of Christoffel symbols.
- Weyl's lemma (Laplace equation).
- Earnshaw's theorem which shows that stable static gravitational, electrostatic or magnetic suspension is impossible.
- Del in cylindrical and spherical coordinates.
- Other situations in which a Laplacian is defined are: analysis on fractals, time scale calculus and discrete exterior calculus.
- Nodal line conjecture, regarding the location of the nodal line of the second Dirichlet eigenfunction
- Schrödinger operator
- Paneitz operator
