= Nodal line conjecture =

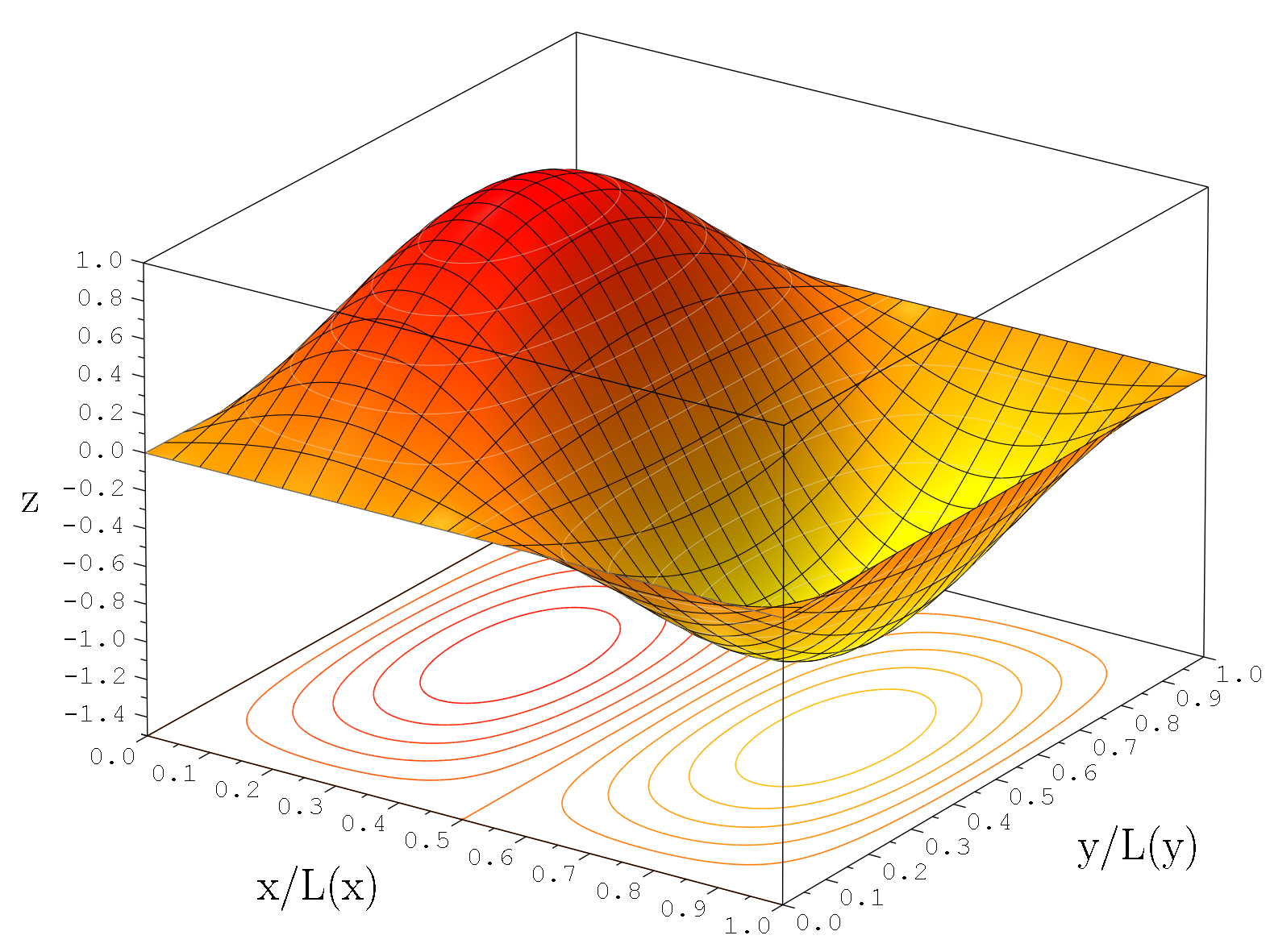
A second eigenfunction in a rectangular domain; the nodal line is visible at the bottom.

In mathematics, the nodal line conjecture is a statement posed in 1967 by Lawrence E. Payne about the Laplacian partial differential equation. The original conjecture predicts that for the Dirichlet problem on a bounded two-dimensional domain, the second eigenfunction has a nodal line that meets the boundary of the domain. The general conjecture was proved false in 1997 by carving a large number of microscopic holes out of a disk, a technique that simulates a Schrödinger potential.

Other positive and negative results are known for various special cases of domains; in general, it remains an open problem to describe how simple the domain must be for the conjecture to hold.
