= Dirichlet energy =

Mathematical measure of a function's variability

In mathematics, the Dirichlet energy is a measure of how variable a function is. More abstractly, it is a quadratic functional on the Sobolev space H^{1}. The Dirichlet energy is intimately connected to Laplace's equation and is named after the German mathematician Peter Gustav Lejeune Dirichlet.

== Definition ==
Given an open set Ω ⊆ R^{n} and a differentiable function u : Ω → R, the Dirichlet energy of the function u is the real number

$$E[u] = \frac 1 2 \int_\Omega \| \nabla u(x) \|^2 \, dx,$$

where ∇u : Ω → R^{n} denotes the gradient vector field of the function u.

== Properties and applications ==
Since it is the integral of a non-negative quantity, the Dirichlet energy is itself non-negative, i.e. E[u] ≥ 0 for every function u.

Solving Laplace's equation $-\Delta u(x) = 0$ for all $x \in \Omega$, subject to appropriate boundary conditions, is equivalent to solving the variational problem of finding a function u that satisfies the boundary conditions and has minimal Dirichlet energy.

Such a solution is called a harmonic function and such solutions are the topic of study in potential theory.

In a more general setting, where Ω ⊆ R^{n} is replaced by any Riemannian manifold M, and u : Ω → R is replaced by u : M → Φ for another (different) Riemannian manifold Φ, the Dirichlet energy is given by the sigma model. The solutions to the Lagrange equations for the sigma model Lagrangian are those functions u that minimize/maximize the Dirichlet energy. Restricting this general case back to the specific case of u : Ω → R just shows that the Lagrange equations (or, equivalently, the Hamilton–Jacobi equations) provide the basic tools for obtaining extremal solutions.

== See also ==
- Dirichlet's principle – Concept in potential theory
- Dirichlet eigenvalue – Modes of vibration in mathematics
- Total variation – Measure of local oscillation behavior
- Bounded mean oscillation – real-valued function whose mean oscillation is bounded
- Harmonic map – smooth map that is a critical point of the Dirichlet energy functional
- Capacity of a set – In Euclidean space, a measure of that set's "size"
