= Loredana Lanzani =

Italian-American mathematician (born 1965)

Loredana Lanzani (born 1965) is an Italian-American mathematician specializing in harmonic analysis, partial differential equations, and complex analysis. She is a professor of mathematics at Syracuse University.

== Education and career ==
Lanzani earned a laurea from the University of Rome Tor Vergata in 1989, and completed a Ph.D. at Purdue University in 1997. Her dissertation, A New Perspective On The Cauchy Transform For Non-Smooth Domains In The Plane And Applications, was supervised by Steven R. Bell.

She became an assistant professor at the University of Arkansas in 1997, and moved up the academic ranks there until becoming a full professor in 2008, also being given the Robert C. & Sandra Connor Endowed Faculty Fellowship in the same year. From 2011 to 2013 she was a program director for the National Science Foundation, and in 2014 she took her present position as a professor of mathematics at Syracuse University.

== Recognition ==
Lanzani was named a Fellow of the American Mathematical Society, in the 2022 class of fellows, "for contributions to function theory in one and several complex variables". She became the first Syracuse University mathematician to win this honor.
