= Dirichlet's principle =

Concept in potential theory

In mathematics, and particularly in potential theory, Dirichlet's principle is the assumption that the minimizer of a certain energy functional is a solution to Poisson's equation.

== Formal statement ==
Dirichlet's principle states that, if the function $u ( x )$ is the solution to Poisson's equation

$$\Delta u + f = 0$$

on a domain $\Omega$ of $\mathbb{R}^n$ with boundary condition

$u=g$ on the boundary $\partial\Omega$,

then u can be obtained as the minimizer of the Dirichlet energy

$$E[v(x)] = \int_\Omega \left(\frac{1}{2}|\nabla v|^2 - vf\right)\,\mathrm{d}x$$

amongst all twice differentiable functions $v$ such that $v=g$ on $\partial\Omega$ (provided that there exists at least one function making the Dirichlet's integral finite). This concept is named after the German mathematician Peter Gustav Lejeune Dirichlet.

== History ==
The name "Dirichlet's principle" is due to Bernhard Riemann, who applied it in the study of complex analytic functions.

Riemann (and others such as Carl Friedrich Gauss and Peter Gustav Lejeune Dirichlet) knew that Dirichlet's integral is bounded below, which establishes the existence of an infimum; however, he took for granted the existence of a function that attains the minimum. Karl Weierstrass published the first criticism of this assumption in 1870, giving an example of a functional that has a greatest lower bound which is not a minimum value. Weierstrass's example was the functional

$$J(\varphi) = \int_{-1}^{1} \left( x \frac{d\varphi}{dx} \right)^2 \, dx$$

where $\varphi$ is continuous on $[-1,1]$, continuously differentiable on $(-1,1)$, and subject to boundary conditions $\varphi(-1)=a$, $\varphi(1)=b$ where $a$ and $b$ are constants and $a \ne b$. Weierstrass showed that $\textstyle \inf_\varphi J(\varphi) = 0$, but no admissible function $\varphi$ can make $J(\varphi)$ equal 0. This example did not disprove Dirichlet's principle per se, since the example integral is different from Dirichlet's integral. But it did undermine the reasoning that Riemann had used, and spurred interest in proving Dirichlet's principle as well as broader advancements in the calculus of variations and ultimately functional analysis.

In 1900, Hilbert later justified Riemann's use of Dirichlet's principle by developing the direct method in the calculus of variations.

== See also ==
- Dirichlet problem
- Hilbert's twentieth problem
- Plateau's problem
- Green's first identity
