= Green's function number =

In mathematical heat conduction, the Green's function number is used to uniquely categorize certain fundamental solutions of the heat equation to make existing solutions easier to identify, store, and retrieve.

Numbers have long been used to identify types of boundary conditions. The Green's function number system was proposed by Beck and Litkouhi in 1988 and has seen increasing use since then. The number system has been used to catalog a large collection of Green's functions and related solutions.

Although the examples given below are for the heat equation, this number system applies to any phenomena described by differential equations such as diffusion, acoustics, electromagnetics, fluid dynamics, etc.

== Notation ==
The Green's function number specifies the coordinate system and the type of boundary conditions that a Green's function satisfies. The Green's function number has two parts, a letter designation followed by a number designation. The letter(s) designate the coordinate system, while the numbers designate the type of boundary conditions that are satisfied.

Table 1. Boundary conditions designations for Green's function number system.
Name	Boundary condition	Number
No physical boundary	G is bounded	0
Dirichlet	$G = 0$	1
Neumann	$\frac{\partial G}{\partial n} = 0$	2
Robin	$k \frac{\partial G}{\partial n} + h G= 0$	3

Some of the designations for the Greens function number system are given next. Coordinate system designations include: X, Y, and Z for Cartesian coordinates; R, Z, φ for cylindrical coordinates; and, RS, φ, θ for spherical coordinates. Designations for several boundary conditions are given in Table 1. The zeroth boundary condition is important for identifying the presence of a coordinate boundary where no physical boundary exists, for example, far away in a semi-infinite body or at the center of a cylindrical or spherical body.

== Examples in Cartesian coordinates ==
=== X11 ===
As an example, number X11 denotes the Green's function that satisfies the heat equation in the domain (0 < x < L) for boundary conditions of type 1 (Dirichlet) at both boundaries x = 0 and x = L. Here X denotes the Cartesian coordinate and 11 denotes the type 1 boundary condition at both sides of the body. The boundary value problem for the X11 Green's function is given by

Equation	$\frac{\partial^2 G}{\partial x^2} + \frac{1}{\alpha} \delta(t - \tau) \delta(x - x') = \frac{1}{\alpha} \frac{\partial G}{\partial t}$
Domain	$0 < x < L$; $t > 0$
Boundary conditions	$G(x=0) = 0$, $G(x=L) = 0$; $G(t<\tau) = 0$

Here $\alpha$ is the thermal diffusivity (m^{2}/s) and $\delta$ is the Dirac delta function. This GF is developed elsewhere.

=== X20 ===
As another Cartesian example, number X20 denotes the Green's function in the semi-infinite body ($0<x<\infty$) with a Neumann (type 2) boundary at x = 0. Here X denotes the Cartesian coordinate, 2 denotes the type 2 boundary condition at x = 0 and 0 denotes the zeroth type boundary condition (boundedness) at $x = \infty$. The boundary value problem for the X20 Green's function is given by

Equation	$\frac{\partial^2 G}{\partial x^2} +\frac{1}{\alpha} \delta(t - \tau) \delta(x - x') = \frac{1}{\alpha} \frac{\partial G}{\partial t}$
Domain	$0 < x < \infty$; $t > 0$
Boundary conditions	$\left.\frac{\partial G}{\partial n} \right|_{x=0}=0$, $\left.G \right|_{x\to \infty}$ is bounded, $G(t<\tau) = 0$

This GF is published elsewhere.

=== X10Y20 ===
As a two-dimensional example, number X10Y20 denotes the Green's function in the quarter-infinite body ($0<x<\infty$, $0<y<\infty$) with a Dirichlet (type 1) boundary at x = 0 and a Neumann (type 2) boundary at y = 0. The boundary value problem for the X10Y20 Green's function is given by

Equation	$\frac{\partial^2 G}{\partial x^2} +\frac{\partial^2 G}{\partial y^2} + \frac{1}{\alpha} \delta(t - \tau) \delta(x - x') \delta(y - y') = \frac{1}{\alpha} \frac{\partial G}{\partial t}$
Domain	$0 < x < \infty$; $0 < y < \infty$; $t > 0$
Boundary conditions	$G(x=0) = 0$, $\left.G \right|_{x\to \infty}$ is bounded, $\left.\frac{\partial G}{\partial n} \right|_{y=0}=0$, $G |_{y\to \infty}$ is bounded, $G(t<\tau) = 0$

Applications of related half-space and quarter-space GF are available.

== Examples in cylindrical coordinates ==
=== R03 ===
As an example in the cylindrical coordinate system, number R03 denotes the Green's function that satisfies the heat equation in the solid cylinder (0 < r < a) with a boundary condition of type 3 (Robin) at r = a. Here letter R denotes the cylindrical coordinate system, number 0 denotes the zeroth boundary condition (boundedness) at the center of the cylinder (r = 0), and number 3 denotes the type 3 (Robin) boundary condition at r = a. The boundary value problem for R03 Green's function is given by

Equation	$\frac{1}{r} \frac{\partial}{\partial r} \left( r \frac{\partial G}{\partial r} \right) + \frac{1}{\alpha} \delta(t - \tau) \frac{\delta(r - r')}{2 \pi r'} = \frac{1}{\alpha} \frac{\partial G}{\partial t}$
Domain	$0 < r < a$; $t > 0$
Boundary conditions	$G(r=0)$ is bounded, $\left. k \frac{\partial G}{\partial n} \right|_{r=a} + \left. h G \right|_{r=a} =0$, $G(t<\tau) = 0$

Here $k$ is thermal conductivity (W/(m K)) and $h$ is the heat transfer coefficient (W/(m^{2} K)). See Carslaw & Jaeger (1959, p. 369), Cole et al. (2011, p. 543) for this GF.

=== R10 ===
As another example, number R10 denotes the Green's function in a large body containing a cylindrical void (a < r < $\infty$) with a type 1 (Dirichlet) boundary condition at r = a. Again letter R denotes the cylindrical coordinate system, number 1 denotes the type 1 boundary at r = a, and number 0 denotes the type zero boundary (boundedness) at large values of r. The boundary value problem for the R10 Green's function is given by

Equation	$\frac{1}{r} \frac{\partial}{\partial r} \left( r \frac{\partial G}{\partial r} \right) + \frac{1}{\alpha} \delta(t - \tau) \frac{\delta(r - r')}{2 \pi r'} = \frac{1}{\alpha} \frac{\partial G}{\partial t}$
Domain	$a < r < \infty$; $t > 0$
Boundary conditions	$G(r=a) = 0$, $G |_{r\to \infty}$ is bounded, $G(t<\tau) = 0$

This GF is available elsewhere.

=== R01φ00 ===
As a two dimensional example, number R01φ00 denotes the Green's function in a solid cylinder with angular dependence, with a type 1 (Dirichlet) boundary condition at r = a. Here letter φ denotes the angular (azimuthal) coordinate, and numbers 00 denote the type zero boundaries for angle; here no physical boundary takes the form of the periodic boundary condition. The boundary value problem for the R01φ00 Green's function is given by

Equation	$\frac{1}{r}\frac{\partial}{\partial r} \left( r \frac{\partial G}{\partial r} \right) + \frac{1}{r^2}\frac{\partial^2 G}{\partial \phi^2} + \frac{1}{\alpha} \delta(t - \tau) \frac{\delta(r - r')}{2 \pi r'} \delta(\phi - \phi ') = \frac{1}{\alpha} \frac{\partial G}{\partial t}$
Domain	$0 < r < a$; $0 < \phi < 2\pi$; $t > 0$
Boundary conditions	$G(r=0)$ is bounded, $G(r=a) = 0$, $G(\phi=0) = G(\phi=2\pi)$, $\left.\frac{\partial G}{\partial \phi}\right|_{\phi=0} = \left.\frac{\partial G}{\partial \phi} \right|_{\phi=2 \pi}$; $G(t<\tau) = 0$

Both a transient and steady form of this GF are available.

== Example in spherical coordinates ==
=== RS02 ===
As an example in the spherical coordinate system, number RS02 denotes the Green's function for a solid sphere (0 < r < b) with a type 2 (Neumann) boundary condition at r = b. Here letters RS denote the radial-spherical coordinate system, number 0 denotes the zeroth boundary condition (boundedness) at r = 0, and number 2 denotes the type 2 boundary at r = b. The boundary value problem for the RS02 Green's function is given by

Equation	$\frac{1}{r^2}\frac{\partial}{\partial r} \left( r^2 \frac{\partial G}{\partial r} \right) + \frac{1}{\alpha} \delta(t - \tau) \frac{\delta(r - r')}{4 \pi r^2} = \frac{1}{\alpha} \frac{\partial G}{\partial t}$
Domain	$0 < r < b$; $t > 0$
Boundary conditions	$G(r=0)$ is bounded, $\left.\frac{\partial G}{\partial n} \right|_{r=a} = 0$, $G(t<\tau) = 0$

This GF is available elsewhere.

== See also ==
- Fundamental solution
- Dirichlet boundary condition
- Neumann boundary condition
- Robin boundary condition
- Heat equation
