= Guo Zengyuan =

Zeng-Yuan Guo (Chinese: 过增元; pinyin: Guò Zēng-yuán), born 20 February 1936 in Jiangsu Province, is a professor in the Department of Engineering Mechanics (School of Aerospace) in Tsinghua University, Beijing, China. He is a member of the Chinese Academy of Sciences (1997) and a ASME fellow (1998).

== Academic contributions ==
Guo's work has been focused in thermofluid mechanics, heat transfer processes at the micro and nano scales, optimization of thermodynamic systems, and more efficient thermal transport. In 1994 he introduced the concepts of thermal drag, thermal drive, thermal displacement, and thermal instability, which use analogies to mechanical systems to describe properties in thermal systems.

=== Thermomass theory ===
Thermomass theory models heat transfer as a gas-like flow from heat carriers, caused by a pressure gradient. In this framework, heat has a dual nature, acting as mass during transfer and as energy during transformation. This approach has been applied, for example, in modeling heat conduction in nanosystems, where non-local, non-linear effects not fully accounted by Fourier's law heat equation and by the Maxwell-Cattaneo-Vernotte equation are more significant.

In 2013, Prof. Guo's group was granted major project funding by the National Natural Science Foundation of China for their work in developing thermomass theory.

=== Entransy ===
The concept of entransy, developed by Guo's group, is based on an analogy between electrical conduction and heat conduction. Their work in "Entransy dissipation in heat exchangers" was included in the top 10 research fronts in mathematics, computer science and engineering by Thomson-Reuters in 2014.

The concept of entransy has been accused of plagiarism as well as criticized for being incorrect and a hoax, by Adrian Bejan and others, with Milivoje Kostic writing a critical perspective on the issue.

== Awards ==
Early in his career, Guo received a Humboldt Research Award from the Alexander Von Humboldt Foundation to work in the Technical University of Munich between 1979 and 1981. One of the first Chinese members of the American Society of Mechanical Engineers, he was named a Fellow in 1998. In 2017 he received an Outstanding Achievement Award from the Asian Union of Thermal Science and Engineering for his life-time dedication to the area.
