= Robert Mark Gabriel =

New Zealand mathematician (1902–1957)

Robert Mark Gabriel (August 23, 1902, in Leyton – February 1957) was a New Zealand mathematician at the University of Otago who worked on analysis, in particular on Green's functions.
