= Parametrix =

Concept in the solution of linear partial differential equations

In mathematics, and specifically the field of partial differential equations (PDEs), a parametrix is an approximation to a fundamental solution of a PDE, and is essentially an approximate inverse to a differential operator.

A parametrix for a differential operator is often easier to construct than a fundamental solution, and for many purposes is almost as good. It is sometimes possible to construct a fundamental solution from a parametrix by iteratively improving it.

== Overview and informal definition ==
It is useful to review what a fundamental solution for a differential operator P(D) with constant coefficients is: it is a distribution u on $\mathbb{R}^{n}$ such that

$$P(D){u(x)} = \delta(x)~,$$

in the weak sense, where δ is the Dirac delta distribution.

In a similar way, a parametrix for a variable coefficient differential operator P(x,D) is a distribution u such that

$$P(x,D){u(x)} = \delta(x) + \omega(x) ~,$$

where ω is some C ^{∞} function with compact support.

The parametrix is a useful concept in the study of elliptic differential operators and, more generally, of hypoelliptic pseudodifferential operators with variable coefficient, since for such operators over appropriate domains a parametrix can be shown to exist, can be somewhat easily constructed and be a smooth function away from the origin.

Having found the analytic expression of the parametrix, it is possible to compute the solution of the associated fairly general elliptic partial differential equation by solving an associated Fredholm integral equation: also, the structure itself of the parametrix reveals properties of the solution of the problem without even calculating it, like its smoothness and other qualitative properties.

== Parametrices for pseudodifferential operators ==
More generally, if L is any pseudodifferential operator of order p, then another pseudodifferential operator L^{+} of order –p is called a parametrix for L if the operators

$$L\circ L^+ - I,\quad L^+\circ L -I$$

are both pseudodifferential operators of negative order. The operators L and L^{+} will admit continuous extensions to maps between the Sobolev spaces H^{s} and H^{s+k}.

On a compact manifold, the differences above are compact operators. In this case the original operator L defines a Fredholm operator between the Sobolev spaces.

== Hadamard parametrix construction ==
An explicit construction of a parametrix for second order partial differential operators based on power series developments was discovered by Jacques Hadamard. It can be applied to the Laplace operator, the wave equation and the heat equation.

In the case of the heat equation or the wave equation, where there is a distinguished time parameter t, Hadamard's method consists in taking the fundamental solution of the constant coefficient differential operator obtained freezing the coefficients at a fixed point and seeking a general solution as a product of this solution, as the point varies, by a formal power series in t. The constant term is 1 and the higher coefficients are functions determined recursively as integrals in a single variable.

In general, the power series will not converge but will provide only an asymptotic expansion of the exact solution. A suitable truncation of the power series then yields a parametrix.

== Construction of a fundamental solution from a parametrix ==
A sufficiently good parametrix can often be used to construct an exact fundamental solution by a convergent iterative procedure as follows (Berger, Gauduchon & Mazet 1971).

If L is an element of a ring with multiplication * such that

$$L*P=1+R$$

for some approximate right inverse P and "sufficiently small" remainder term R then, at least formally,

$$L*P*(1-R+R*R-R*R*R+\cdots) = 1$$

so if the infinite series makes sense then L has a right inverse

$$P-P*R+P*R*R-P*R*R*R+\cdots$$.

If L is a pseudo-differential operator and P is a parametrix, this gives a right inverse to L, in other words a fundamental solution, provided that R is "small enough" which in practice means that it should be a sufficiently good smoothing operator.

If P and R are represented by functions, then the multiplication * of pseudo-differential operators corresponds to convolution of functions, so the terms of the infinite sum giving the fundamental solution of L involve convolution of P with copies of R.
