= Victor Gustave Robin =

French mathematician

Victor Gustave Robin (French: [viktɔʁ ɡystav ʁɔbɛ̃]; 17 May 1855 – 1897) was a French mathematical analyst and applied mathematician who lectured in mathematical physics at the Sorbonne in Paris and also worked in the area of thermodynamics. He is known especially for the Robin boundary condition. The French Academy of Sciences awarded him the Prix Francœur for 1893 and again for 1897 and the Prix Poncelet for 1895.
