= Boundary value problem =

Type of problem involving ODEs or PDEs

Shows a region where a differential equation is valid and the associated boundary values

In the study of differential equations, a boundary-value problem is a differential equation subjected to constraints called boundary conditions. A solution to a boundary value problem is a solution to the differential equation which also satisfies the boundary conditions.

Boundary value problems arise in several branches of physics as any physical differential equation will have them. Problems involving the wave equation, such as the determination of normal modes, are often stated as boundary value problems. A large class of important boundary value problems are the Sturm–Liouville problems. The analysis of these problems, in the linear case, involves the eigenfunctions of a differential operator.

To be useful in applications, a boundary value problem should be well posed. This means that given the input to the problem there exists a unique solution, which depends continuously on the input. Much theoretical work in the field of partial differential equations is devoted to proving that boundary value problems arising from scientific and engineering applications are in fact well-posed.

Among the earliest boundary value problems to be studied is the Dirichlet problem, of finding the harmonic functions (solutions to Laplace's equation); the solution was given by the Dirichlet's principle.

== Explanation ==
Boundary value problems are similar to initial value problems. A boundary value problem has conditions specified at the extremes ("boundaries") of the independent variable in the equation whereas an initial value problem has all of the conditions specified at the same value of the independent variable (and that value is at the lower boundary of the domain, thus the term "initial" value). A boundary value is a data value that corresponds to a minimum or maximum input, internal, or output value specified for a system or component.

For example, if the independent variable is time over the domain [0,1], a boundary value problem would specify values for $y(t)$ at both $t=0$ and $t=1$, whereas an initial value problem would specify a value of $y(t)$ and $y'(t)$ at time $t=0$.

Finding the temperature at all points of an iron bar with one end kept at absolute zero and the other end at the freezing point of water would be a boundary value problem.

If the problem is dependent on both space and time, one could specify the value of the problem at a given point for all time or at a given time for all space.

Concretely, an example of a boundary value problem (in one spatial dimension) is

$$y''(x)+y(x)=0$$

to be solved for the unknown function $y(x)$ with the boundary conditions

$$y(0)=0, \ y(\pi/2)=2.$$

Without the boundary conditions, the general solution to this equation is

$$y(x) = A \sin(x) + B \cos(x).$$

From the boundary condition $y(0)=0$ one obtains

$$0 = A \cdot 0 + B \cdot 1$$

which implies that $B=0.$ From the boundary condition $y(\pi/2)=2$ one finds

$$2 = A \cdot 1$$

and so $A=2.$ One sees that imposing boundary conditions allowed one to determine a unique solution, which in this case is

$$y(x)=2\sin(x).$$

== Types of boundary value problems ==
The 3 standard classes of conditions are Dirichlet, Neumann and Cauchy or Robin, with also mixed, boundary as infinity.

Summary of boundary conditions for the unknown function, $y$, constants $c_0$ and $c_1$ specified by the boundary conditions, and known scalar functions $f$ and $g$ specified by the boundary conditions.

Name	Form on 1st part of boundary	Form on 2nd part of boundary
Dirichlet	$y=f$	
Neumann	${\partial y \over \partial n}=f$	
Robin	$c_0 y + c_1 {\partial y \over \partial n}=f$	
Cauchy	both $y=f$ and ${\partial y \over \partial n}=g$	
Mixed	$y=f$	$c_0 y + c_1 {\partial y \over \partial n}=g$

=== Boundary value conditions ===
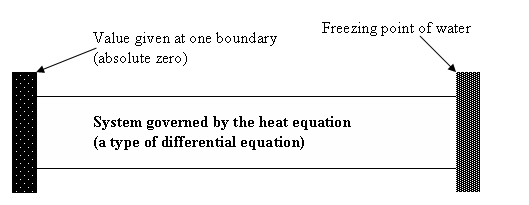
Finding a function to describe the temperature of this idealised 2D rod is a boundary value problem with Dirichlet boundary conditions. Any solution function will both solve the heat equation, and fulfill the boundary conditions of a temperature of 0 K on the left boundary and a temperature of 273.15 K on the right boundary.

A type 1 boundary condition, Dirichlet boundary condition, specifies the value of the function itself. For example, if one end of an iron rod is held at absolute zero, then the value of the problem would be known at that point in space.

A type 2 boundary condition, Neumann boundary condition, specifies the value of the normal derivative of the function. For example, if there is a heater at one end of an iron rod, then energy would be added at a constant rate but the actual temperature would not be known.

A type 3 boundary condition is the Robin condition.

If the boundary has the form of a curve or surface that gives a value to the normal derivative and the variable itself then it is a Cauchy boundary condition.

A type 0 boundary condition has no physical boundary.

=== Differential operators ===
Aside from the boundary condition, boundary value problems are also classified according to the type of differential operator involved. For an elliptic operator, one discusses elliptic boundary value problems. For a hyperbolic operator, one discusses hyperbolic boundary value problems. These categories are further subdivided into linear and various nonlinear types.

== Applications ==
=== Electromagnetic potential ===
In electrostatics, a common problem is to find a function which describes the electric potential of a given region. If the region does not contain charge, the potential must be a solution to Laplace's equation (a so-called harmonic function). The boundary conditions in this case are the Interface conditions for electromagnetic fields. If there is no current density in the region, it is also possible to define a magnetic scalar potential using a similar procedure.

== See also ==
Related mathematics:

- Initial value problem
- Green's function
- Stochastic processes and boundary value problems
- Sturm–Liouville theory
- Sommerfeld radiation condition
- Perfect thermal contact condition

Physical applications:

- Waves
- Normal mode
- Electrostatics
- Potential theory
- Computation of radiowave attenuation in the atmosphere
- Black hole

Numerical algorithms:

- Shooting method
- Direct multiple shooting method
- Walk-on-spheres method
- Finite difference method
- Boundary element method

== Bibliography ==
- A. D. Polyanin and V. F. Zaitsev, Handbook of Exact Solutions for Ordinary Differential Equations (2nd edition), Chapman & Hall/CRC Press, Boca Raton, 2003. ISBN 1-58488-297-2.
- A. D. Polyanin, Handbook of Linear Partial Differential Equations for Engineers and Scientists, Chapman & Hall/CRC Press, Boca Raton, 2002. ISBN 1-58488-299-9.
