= Boundary conditions in fluid dynamics =

Constraints to computational problems

Boundary conditions in fluid dynamics are the set of constraints to boundary value problems in computational fluid dynamics. These boundary conditions include inlet boundary conditions, outlet boundary conditions, wall boundary conditions, constant pressure boundary conditions, axisymmetric boundary conditions, symmetric boundary conditions, and periodic or cyclic boundary conditions. Using the appropriate type of boundary conditions is critical for converging into a physically relevant solution especially for time-dependent problems and multiphase flows.

Transient problems require one more thing i.e., initial conditions where initial values of flow variables are specified at nodes in the flow domain. Various types of boundary conditions are used in CFD for different conditions and purposes and are discussed as follows.

== Inlet boundary conditions ==
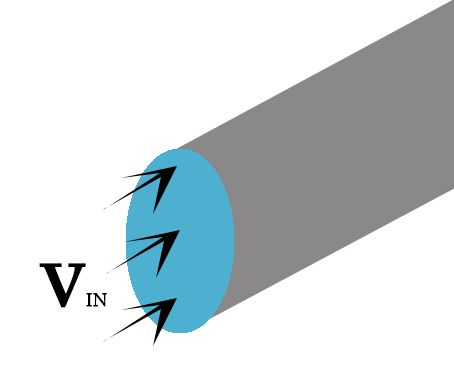
Showing inlet flow velocity in a pipe

In inlet boundary conditions, the distribution of all flow variables needs to be specified at inlet boundaries, mainly flow velocity. This type of boundary conditions are common and specified mostly where inlet flow velocity is known.

== Outlet boundary condition ==
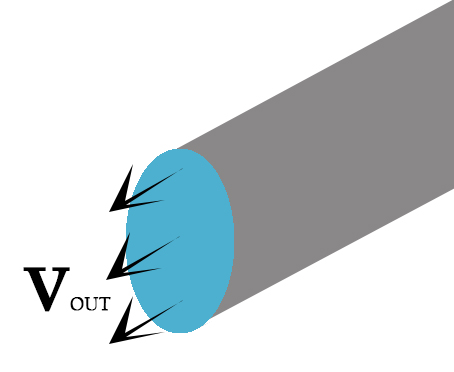
Showing outlet flow velocity in a pipe

In outlet boundary conditions, the distribution of all flow variables needs to be specified, mainly flow velocity. This can be thought as a conjunction to inlet boundary condition. This type of boundary conditions is common and specified mostly where outlet velocity is known. The flow attains a fully developed state where no change occurs in the flow direction when the outlet is selected far away from the geometrical disturbances. In such region, an outlet could be outlined and the gradient of all variables could be equated to zero in the flow direction except pressure.

== No-slip boundary condition ==
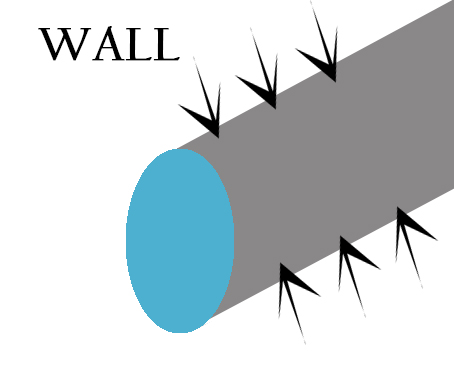
Showing wall boundary condition

The most common boundary that comes upon in confined fluid flow problems is the wall of the conduit. The appropriate requirement is called the no-slip boundary condition, wherein the normal component of velocity is fixed at zero, and the tangential component is set equal to the velocity of the wall. It may run counter to intuition, but the no-slip condition has been firmly established in both experiment and theory, though only after decades of controversy and debate.
$$V_\text{normal} = 0$$
$$V_\text{tangential} = V_\text{wall}$$

Heat transfer through the wall can be specified or if the walls are considered adiabatic, then heat transfer across the wall is set to zero.

$$Q_\text{Adiabatic Walls} = 0$$

== Constant pressure boundary conditions ==
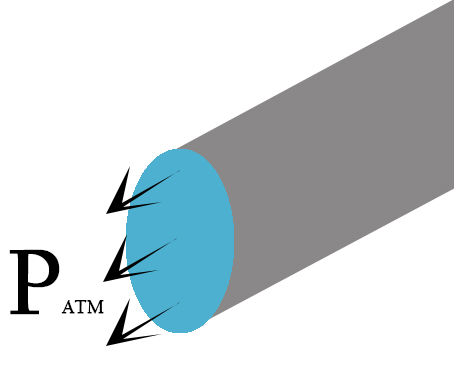
Showing constant pressure boundary condition

This type of boundary condition is used where boundary values of pressure are known and the exact details of the flow distribution are unknown. This includes pressure inlet and outlet conditions mainly. Typical examples that utilize this boundary condition include buoyancy driven flows, internal flows with multiple outlets, free surface flows and external flows around objects. An example is flow outlet into atmosphere where pressure is atmospheric.

== Axisymmetric boundary conditions ==
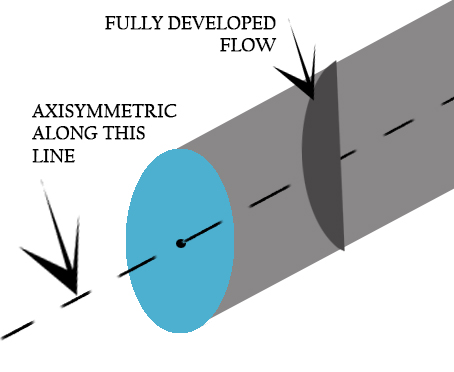
Showing axisymmetric boundary condition

In this boundary condition, the model is axisymmetric with respect to the main axis such that at a particular r = R, all θs and each z = Z-slice, each flow variable has the same value. A good example is the flow in a circular pipe where the flow and pipe axes coincide.

$V_r(R, \theta, Z) = Constant$ $(r=R, \theta, Z)$

== Symmetric boundary condition ==
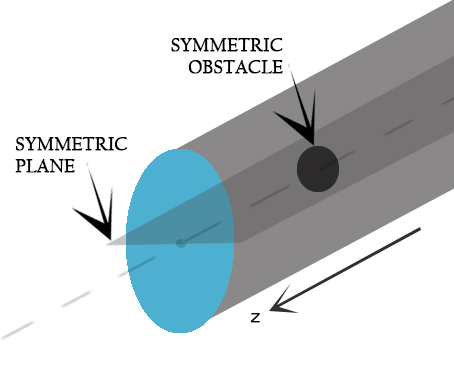
Showing symmetric boundary condition

In this boundary condition, it is assumed that on the two sides of the boundary, same physical processes exist. All the variables have same value and gradients at the same distance from the boundary. It acts as a mirror that reflects all the flow distribution to the other side. The conditions at symmetric boundary are no flow across boundary and no scalar flux across boundary.

A good example is of a pipe flow with a symmetric obstacle in the flow. The obstacle divides the upper flow and lower flow as mirrored flow.

== Periodic or cyclic boundary condition ==
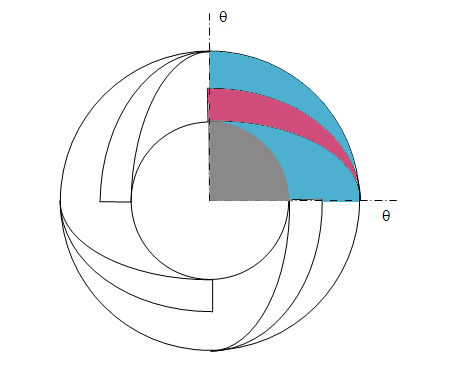
A quarter showing cyclic boundary condition

A periodic or cyclic boundary condition arises from a different type of symmetry in a problem. If a component has a repeated pattern in flow distribution more than twice, thus violating the mirror image requirements required for symmetric boundary condition. A good example would be swept vane pump (Fig.), where the marked area is repeated four times in r-theta coordinates. The cyclic-symmetric areas should have the same flow variables and distribution and should satisfy that in every Z-slice. In other cases, the governing conservation equations must be modified appropriately to accommodate the application of such cyclic conditions.

== See also ==
- Flow conditioning
- Initial value problem
