= Perfect thermal contact =

Perfect thermal contact of the surface of a solid with the environment (convective heat transfer) or another solid occurs when the temperatures of the mating surfaces are equal.

== Perfect thermal contact conditions ==
Perfect thermal contact supposes that on the boundary surface $A$ there holds an equality of the temperatures

$$T\big|_{A}=T_e\big|_A \,$$

and an equality of heat fluxes

$$-k\frac{\partial T}{\partial n}\bigg|_A =-k_e \frac{\partial T_e}{\partial n}\bigg|_A \,$$

where $T,~T_e$ are temperatures of the solid and environment (or mating solid), respectively; $k,~k_e$ are thermal conductivity coefficients of the solid and mating laminar layer (or solid), respectively; $n$ is normal to the surface $A$.

If there is a heat source on the boundary surface $A$, e.g. caused by sliding friction, the latter equality transforms in the following manner

$$-k\frac{\partial T}{\partial n}\bigg|_A + k_e \frac{\partial T_e}{\partial n}\bigg|_A = q \,$$

where $q$ is heat-generation rate per unit area.
