= Relativistic heat conduction =

Model compatible with special relativity

Relativistic heat conduction refers to the modelling of heat conduction (and similar diffusion processes) in a way compatible with special relativity. In special (and general) relativity, the usual heat equation for non-relativistic heat conduction must be modified, as it leads to faster-than-light signal propagation. Relativistic heat conduction, therefore, encompasses a set of models for heat propagation in continuous media (solids, fluids, gases) that are consistent with relativistic causality, namely the principle that an effect must be within the light-cone associated to its cause. Any reasonable relativistic model for heat conduction must also be stable, in the sense that differences in temperature propagate both slower than light and are damped over time (this stability property is intimately intertwined with relativistic causality).

== Parabolic model (non-relativistic) ==
Heat conduction in a Newtonian context is modelled by the Fourier equation, namely a parabolic partial differential equation of the kind:
$$\frac{\partial\theta}{\partial t}~=~\alpha~\nabla^2\theta ,$$
where θ is temperature, t is time, α = k/(ρ c) is thermal diffusivity, k is thermal conductivity, ρ is density, and c is specific heat capacity. The Laplace operator, $\nabla^2$, is defined in Cartesian coordinates as
$$\nabla^2~=~\frac{\partial^2}{\partial x^2}~+~\frac{\partial^2}{\partial y^2}~+~\frac{\partial^2}{\partial z^2} .$$

This Fourier equation can be derived by substituting Fourier's linear approximation of the heat flux vector, q, as a function of temperature gradient,
$$\mathbf{q}~=~-k~\nabla\theta ,$$
into the first law of thermodynamics
$$\rho~c~\frac{\partial \theta}{\partial t}~+ ~\nabla \cdot \mathbf{q}~=~ 0 ,$$
where the del operator, ∇, is defined in 3D as
$$\nabla ~ = ~\mathbf{i}~\frac{\partial}{\partial x}~+~\mathbf{j}~\frac{\partial}{\partial y}~+~\mathbf{k}~\frac{\partial}{\partial z} .$$

It can be shown that this definition of the heat flux vector also satisfies the second law of thermodynamics,
$$\nabla\cdot\left(\frac{\mathbf{q}}{\theta}\right)~+~\rho~\frac{\partial s}{\partial t}~=~\sigma,$$
where s is specific entropy and σ is entropy production. This mathematical model is inconsistent with special relativity: the Green function associated to the heat equation (also known as heat kernel) has support that extends outside the light-cone, leading to faster-than-light propagation of information. For example, consider a pulse of heat at the origin; then according to Fourier equation, it is felt (i.e. temperature changes) at any distant point, instantaneously. The speed of propagation of heat is faster than the speed of light in vacuum, which is inadmissible within the framework of relativity.

== Hyperbolic model (relativistic) ==
The parabolic model for heat conduction discussed above shows that the Fourier equation (and the more general Fick's law of diffusion) is incompatible with the theory of relativity for at least one reason: it admits infinite speed of propagation of the continuum field (in this case: heat, or temperature gradients). To overcome this contradiction, workers such as Carlo Cattaneo, Vernotte, Chester, and others proposed that Fourier equation should be upgraded from the parabolic to a hyperbolic form, where then, the temperature field $\theta$ is governed by:
$$\frac{1}{C^2}~\frac{\partial^2\theta}{\partial t^2}~+~\frac{1}{\alpha}~\frac{\partial\theta}{\partial t}~ = ~\nabla^2\theta.$$

In this equation, C is called the speed of second sound (that is related to excitations and quasiparticles, like phonons). The equation is known as the "hyperbolic heat conduction" (HHC) equation. Mathematically, the above equation is called "telegraph equation", as it is formally equivalent to the telegrapher's equations, which can be derived from Maxwell's equations of electrodynamics.

For the HHC equation to remain compatible with the first law of thermodynamics, it is necessary to modify the definition of heat flux vector, q, to
$$\tau_{_0}~\frac{\partial\mathbf{q}}{\partial t}~+~\mathbf{q}~=~-k~\nabla\theta,$$
where $\tau_{_0}$ is a relaxation time, such that $C^2~=~ \alpha/ \tau_{_0} .$ This equation for the heat flux is often referred to as "Maxwell-Cattaneo equation". The most important implication of the hyperbolic equation is that by switching from a parabolic (dissipative) to a hyperbolic (includes a conservative term) partial differential equation, there is the possibility of phenomena such as thermal resonance and thermal shock waves.
