= Eigenvalues and eigenvectors of the second derivative =

Mathematical functions and constants

Explicit formulas for eigenvalues and eigenvectors of the second derivative with different boundary conditions are provided both for the continuous and discrete cases. In the discrete case, the standard central difference approximation of the second derivative is used on a uniform grid.

These formulas are used to derive the expressions for eigenfunctions of Laplacian in case of separation of variables, as well as to find eigenvalues and eigenvectors of multidimensional discrete Laplacian on a regular grid, which is presented as a Kronecker sum of discrete Laplacians in one-dimension.

== The continuous case ==
The index j represents the jth eigenvalue or eigenvector and runs from 1 to $\infty$. Assuming the equation is defined on the domain $x \in [0,L]$, the following are the eigenvalues and normalized eigenvectors. The eigenvalues are ordered in descending order.

=== Pure Dirichlet boundary conditions ===
$$\lambda_j = -\frac{j^2 \pi^2}{L^2}$$

$$v_j(x) = \sqrt{\frac{2}{L}} \sin\left(\frac{j \pi x}{L}\right)$$

=== Pure Neumann boundary conditions ===
$$\lambda_j = -\frac{(j - 1)^2 \pi^2}{L^2}$$

$$v_j(x) =
\left\{
\begin{array}{lr}
L^{- \frac{1}{2}} & j = 1\\
\sqrt{\frac{2}{L}} \cos\left(\frac{(j - 1) \pi x}{L} \right) & \mbox{otherwise}
\end{array}
\right.$$

=== Periodic boundary conditions ===
$$\lambda_j =
\left\{
\begin{array}{lr}
-\frac{j^2 \pi^2}{L^2} & \mbox{j is even.}\\
-\frac{(j-1)^2 \pi^2}{L^2} & \mbox{j is odd.}
\end{array}
\right.$$

(That is: $0$ is a simple eigenvalue and all further eigenvalues are given by $\frac{j^2 \pi^2}{L^2}$, $j=1,2,\ldots$, each with multiplicity 2).

$$v_j(x) = \begin{cases}
L^{-\frac{1}{2}} & \mbox{if } j = 1.\\
\sqrt{\frac{2}{L}} \sin\left(\frac{j \pi x}{L}\right) & \mbox{ if j is even.}\\
\sqrt{\frac{2}{L}} \cos\left(\frac{(j-1) \pi x}{L}\right) & \mbox{ if j is odd.}
\end{cases}$$

=== Mixed Dirichlet-Neumann boundary conditions ===
$$\lambda_j = -\frac{(2j - 1)^2 \pi^2}{4 L^2}$$

$$v_j(x) = \sqrt{\frac{2}{L}} \sin\left(\frac{(2j - 1) \pi x}{2 L}\right)$$

=== Mixed Neumann-Dirichlet boundary conditions ===
$$\lambda_j = -\frac{(2j - 1)^2 \pi^2}{4 L^2}$$

$$v_j(x) = \sqrt{\frac{2}{L}} \cos\left(\frac{(2j - 1) \pi x}{2 L}\right)$$

== The discrete case ==
Notation: The index j represents the jth eigenvalue or eigenvector. The index i represents the ith component of an eigenvector. Both i and j go from 1 to n, where the matrix is size n x n. Eigenvectors are normalized. The eigenvalues are ordered in descending order.

=== Pure Dirichlet boundary conditions ===
$$\lambda_j = -\frac{4}{h^2} \sin^2\left(\frac{\pi j}{2(n + 1)}\right)$$

$v_{i,j} = \sqrt{\frac{2}{n+1}} \sin\left(\frac{i j \pi}{n+1}\right)$

=== Pure Neumann boundary conditions ===
$$\lambda_j = -\frac{4}{h^2} \sin^2\left(\frac{\pi (j - 1)}{2n}\right)$$

$$v_{i,j} = \begin{cases}
n^{- \frac{1}{2}} & \mbox{j = 1}\\
\sqrt{\frac{2}{n}} \cos\left(\frac{\pi (j - 1)(i - 0.5)}{n}\right) & \mbox{otherwise}
\end{cases}$$

=== Periodic boundary conditions ===
$$\lambda_j = \begin{cases}
-\frac{4}{h^2} \sin^2\left(\frac{\pi (j-1)}{2n}\right) & \mbox{ if j is odd.}\\
-\frac{4}{h^2} \sin^2\left(\frac{\pi j}{2n}\right) & \mbox{ if j is even.}
\end{cases}$$

(Note that eigenvalues are repeated except for 0 and the largest one if n is even.)

$$v_{i,j} = \begin{cases}
n^{-\frac{1}{2}} & \mbox{if } j = 1.\\
n^{-\frac{1}{2}} (-1)^i & \mbox{if } j = n \mbox{ and n is even.}\\
\sqrt{\frac{2}{n}} \sin\left(\frac{\pi (i-0.5) j}{n} \right) & \mbox{ otherwise if j is even.}\\
\sqrt{\frac{2}{n}} \cos\left(\frac{\pi (i-0.5) (j - 1)}{n}\right) & \mbox{ otherwise if j is odd.}
\end{cases}$$

=== Mixed Dirichlet-Neumann boundary conditions ===
$$\lambda_j = -\frac{4}{h^2} \sin^2\left(\frac{\pi (j-\frac{1}{2})}{2n + 1}\right)$$

$$v_{i,j} = \sqrt{\frac{2}{n+0.5}} \sin\left(\frac{\pi i (2j - 1)}{2n + 1}\right)$$

=== Mixed Neumann-Dirichlet boundary conditions ===
$$\lambda_j = -\frac{4}{h^2} \sin^2\left(\frac{\pi (j-\frac{1}{2})}{2n + 1}\right)$$

$$v_{i,j} = \sqrt{\frac{2}{n+0.5}} \cos\left(\frac{\pi (i-0.5) (2j - 1)}{2n + 1}\right)$$

== Derivation of Eigenvalues and Eigenvectors in the Discrete Case ==
=== Dirichlet case ===
In the 1D discrete case with Dirichlet boundary conditions, we are solving

$$\frac{v_{k+1} -2v_k + v_{k-1}}{h^2} = \lambda v_{k}, \ k=1,...,n, \ v_0 = v_{n+1} = 0.$$

Rearranging terms, we get

$$v_{k+1} = (2 + h^2 \lambda)v_k - v_{k-1}. \!$$

Now let $2 \alpha = (2 + h^2 \lambda)$. Also, assuming $v_1 \neq 0$, we can scale eigenvectors by any nonzero scalar, so scale $v$ so that $v_1 = 1$.

Then we find the recurrence

$$v_0 = 0
\,\!$$

$$v_1 = 1.
\,\!$$

$$v_{k+1} = 2 \alpha v_{k} - v_{k-1}
\,\!$$

Considering $\alpha$ as an indeterminate,

$$v_{k+1} = U_k (\alpha) \,\!$$

where $U_k$ is the kth Chebyshev polynomial of the 2nd kind.

Since $v_{n+1} = 0$, we get that

$$U_n (\alpha) = 0 \,\!$$.

It is clear that the eigenvalues of our problem will be the zeros of the nth Chebyshev polynomial of the second kind, with the relation $2 \alpha = (2 + h^2 \lambda)$.

These zeros are well known and are:

$$\alpha_k = \cos\left(\frac{k \pi}{n+1}\right).
\,\!$$

Plugging these into the formula for $\lambda$,

$$2 \cos\left(\frac{k \pi}{n+1}\right) = h^2 \lambda_k + 2
\,\!$$
$$\lambda_k = -\frac{2}{h^2}\left[1 - \cos\left(\frac{k \pi}{n+1}\right)\right].
\,\!$$

And using a trig formula to simplify, we find

$$\lambda_k = -\frac{4}{h^2}\sin^2\left(\frac{k \pi}{2(n+1)}\right).
\,\!$$

=== Neumann case ===
In the Neumann case, we are solving

$$\frac{v_{k+1} -2v_k + v_{k-1}}{h^2} = \lambda v_{k}, \ k = 1,...,n, \ v'_{0.5} = v'_{n+0.5} = 0.
\,\!$$

In the standard discretization, we introduce $v_{0}\,\!$ and $v_{n+1}\,\!$ and define

$$v'_{0.5} := \frac{v_1 - v_0}{h}, \ v'_{n+0.5} := \frac{v_{n+1} - v_n}{h}
\,\!$$

The boundary conditions are then equivalent to

$$v_1 - v_0 = 0, \ v_{n+1} - v_n = 0.$$

If we make a change of variables,

$$w_k = v_{k+1} - v_k, \ k = 0,...,n
\,\!$$

we can derive the following:

$$\begin{alignat}{2}
\frac{v_{k+1} -2v_k + v_{k-1}}{h^2} & = \lambda v_{k} \\
v_{k+1} -2v_k + v_{k-1} & = h^2 \lambda v_{k} \\
(v_{k+1} - v_k) - (v_k - v_{k-1}) & = h^2 \lambda v_{k} \\
w_k - w_{k-1} & = h^2 \lambda v_{k}  \\
& = h^2 \lambda w_{k-1} + h^2 \lambda v_{k-1} \\
& =  h^2 \lambda w_{k-1} + w_{k-1} - w_{k-2} \\
w_{k} & = (2 + h^2 \lambda) w_{k-1} - w_{k-2} \\
w_{k+1} & = (2 + h^2 \lambda) w_{k} - w_{k-1} \\
& = 2 \alpha w_k - w_{k-1}.
\end{alignat}$$

with $w_{n} = w_{0} = 0$ being the boundary conditions.

This is precisely the Dirichlet formula with $n-1$ interior grid points and grid spacing $h$. Similar to what we saw in the above, assuming $w_{1} \neq 0$, we get

$$\lambda_k = -\frac{4}{h^2}\sin^2\left(\frac{k \pi}{2n}\right), \ k = 1,...,n-1.$$

This gives us $n-1$ eigenvalues and there are $n$. If we drop the assumption that $w_{1} \neq 0$, we find there is also a solution with $v_{k} = \mathrm{constant} \ \forall \ k=0,...,n+1,$ and this corresponds to eigenvalue $0$.

Relabeling the indices in the formula above and combining with the zero eigenvalue, we obtain,

$$\lambda_k = -\frac{4}{h^2}\sin^2\left(\frac{(k-1) \pi}{2n}\right), \ k = 1,...,n.$$

=== Dirichlet-Neumann Case ===
For the Dirichlet-Neumann case, we are solving

$$\frac{v_{k+1} -2v_k + v_{k-1}}{h^2} = \lambda v_{k}, \ k=1,...,n, \ v_0 = v'_{n+0.5} = 0.$$,

where $v'_{n+0.5} := \frac{v_{n+1} - v_n}{h}.$

We need to introduce auxiliary variables $v_{j + 0.5}, \ j = 0,...,n.$

Consider the recurrence

$$v_{k+0.5} = 2 \beta v_{k} - v_{k-0.5}, \text{ for some }\beta \,\!$$.

Also, we know $v_0 = 0$ and assuming $v_{0.5} \neq 0$, we can scale $v_{0.5}$ so that $v_{0.5} = 1.$

We can also write

$$v_{k} = 2 \beta v_{k-0.5} - v_{k-1}
\,\!$$
$$v_{k+1} = 2 \beta v_{k+0.5} - v_{k}.
\,\!$$

Taking the correct combination of these three equations, we can obtain

$$v_{k+1} = (4 \beta^2 - 2) v_{k} - v_{k-1}. \,\!$$

And thus our new recurrence will solve our eigenvalue problem when

$$h^2 \lambda + 2 = (4 \beta^2 - 2). \,\!$$

Solving for $\lambda$ we get

$$\lambda = \frac{4 (\beta^2 - 1)}{h^2}.$$

Our new recurrence gives

$$v_{n+1} = U_{2n + 1}(\beta), \ v_{n} = U_{2n - 1}(\beta), \,\!$$

where $U_{k}(\beta)$ again is the kth Chebyshev polynomial of the 2nd kind.

And combining with our Neumann boundary condition, we have

$$U_{2n + 1}(\beta) - U_{2n - 1}(\beta) = 0. \,\!$$

A well-known formula relates the Chebyshev polynomials of the first kind, $T_k(\beta)$, to those of the second kind by

$$U_{k}(\beta) - U_{k - 2}(\beta) = T_k (\beta).
\,\!$$

Thus our eigenvalues solve

$$T_{2n + 1} (\beta) = 0, \ \lambda = \frac{4 (\beta^2 - 1)}{h^2}. \,\!$$

The zeros of this polynomial are also known to be

$$\beta_{k} = \cos\left(\frac{\pi (k - 0.5)}{2n + 1}\right), \ k=1,...,2n + 1 \,\!$$

And thus

$$\begin{alignat}{2}
\lambda_{k} & = \frac{4}{h^2}\left[\cos^2\left(\frac{\pi (k - 0.5)}{2n + 1}\right) - 1\right] \\
& = -\frac{4}{h^2}\sin^2\left(\frac{\pi (k - 0.5)}{2n + 1}\right).
\end{alignat}$$

Note that there are 2n + 1 of these values, but only the first n + 1 are unique. The (n + 1)th value gives us the zero vector as an eigenvector with eigenvalue 0, which is trivial. This can be seen by returning to the original recurrence. So we consider only the first n of these values to be the n eigenvalues of the Dirichlet - Neumann problem.

$$\lambda_{k} = -\frac{4}{h^2}\sin^2\left(\frac{\pi (k - 0.5)}{2n + 1}\right), \ k = 1,...,n.$$
