= Frei–Chen operator =

Edge detection algorithm

The Frei–Chen operator, sometimes called Frei and Chen operator, is used in image processing for edge detection. It was proposed by Werner Frei and Chung-Ching Chen, researchers at USC's Image Processing Institute, in 1977. The idea is to use a set of orthogonal basis vectors related to distinctive image features, which enable the algorithm to extract boundary elements effectively.

== Formulation ==
The operator uses nine 3×3 kernels which are convolved with the original image to calculate the gradient.

We define the nine kernels ${W1,...,W9}$ as:

$$W1 = \begin{bmatrix} 1 & \sqrt{2} & 1 \\ 0 & 0 & 0 \\  -1 & -\sqrt{2} & -1 \end{bmatrix}
\quad
W2 = \begin{bmatrix} 1 & 0 & -1 \\ \sqrt{2} & 0 & -\sqrt{2} \\ 1 & 0 & -1 \end{bmatrix}$$

$$W3 = \begin{bmatrix} 0 & -1 & \sqrt{2} \\ 1 & 0 & -1 \\  -\sqrt{2} & 1 & 0 \end{bmatrix}
\quad
W4 = \begin{bmatrix} \sqrt{2} & -1 & 0 \\ -1 & 0 & 1 \\ 0 & 1 & -\sqrt{2} \end{bmatrix}$$

$$W5 = \begin{bmatrix} 0 & 1 & 0 \\ -1 & 0 & -1 \\  0 & 1 & 0 \end{bmatrix}
\quad
W6 = \begin{bmatrix} -1 & 0 & 1 \\ 0 & 0 & 0 \\ 1 & 0 & -1 \end{bmatrix}$$

$$W7 = \begin{bmatrix} 1 & -2 & 1 \\ -2 & 4 & -2 \\  1 & -2 & 1 \end{bmatrix}
\quad
W8 = \begin{bmatrix} -2 & 1 & -2 \\ 1 & 4 & 1 \\ -2 & 1 & -2 \end{bmatrix}$$

$$W9 = \begin{bmatrix} 1 & 1 & 1 \\ 1 & 1 & 1 \\  1 & 1 & 1 \end{bmatrix}$$

- The pair $(W1, W2)$ is the isotropic average gradient
- The pair $(W3, W4)$ is used to detect ripples
- The pair $(W5,W6)$ is used to detect lines
- The pair $(W7,W8)$ is the discrete laplacian operator
- $W9$, the averaging operator, added to complete the basis
- $W1,...W4$ are used for edges subspace, $W5,...W8$ used for lines subspace and $W9$ is used to compute averages

Let $B$ be the image sub-area, and $\theta$ be the angle (in $n^2$space), $e$ is the number of orthogonal edge basis vectors $W_1,...W_e$ spanning the edge subspace.

$$\theta = \arccos \left [ \textstyle \sum_{i=1}^e \displaystyle (B * W_i)^2 / \textstyle \sum_{i=1}^9 \displaystyle (B * W_i)^2 \right ]^{\frac{1}{2}}$$

The larger $\theta$, the poorer the fit between B and an element of the edge subspace.

The strategy is to classify image sub-area as containing and edge element only if $\theta$ is small which is done by thresholding.

== Simple description ==
The image is convolved with each of the kernel. Thus, 9 results are obtained.

Vectors $W_1, ... W_4$ are used for edge subspace identification. Hence numerator in the formula will be $\textstyle \sum_{i=1}^4 \displaystyle (B * W_i)^2$. Similarly, for line subspace identification, the numerator will be $\textstyle \sum_{i=5}^8 \displaystyle (B * W_i)^2$.

Using formula, we compute $\theta$, if it is above a certain threshold $r$, we say that an edge is detected in the image sub-area.

== Example comparisons ==
Here, the Frei–Chen operator, along with three different gradient operators is used to detect edges in the test image.

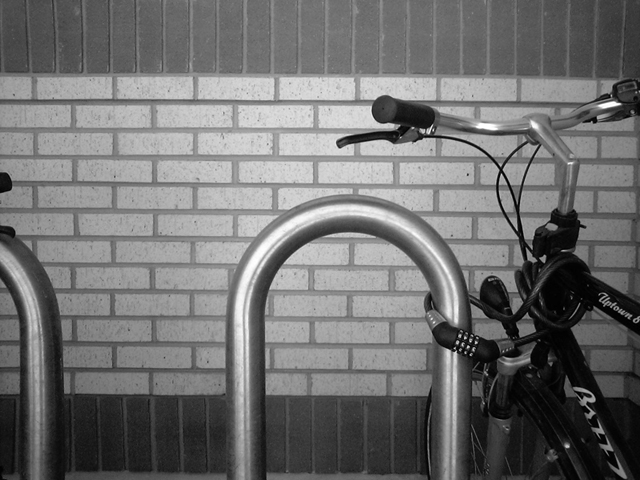
Grayscale test image of brick wall and bike rack

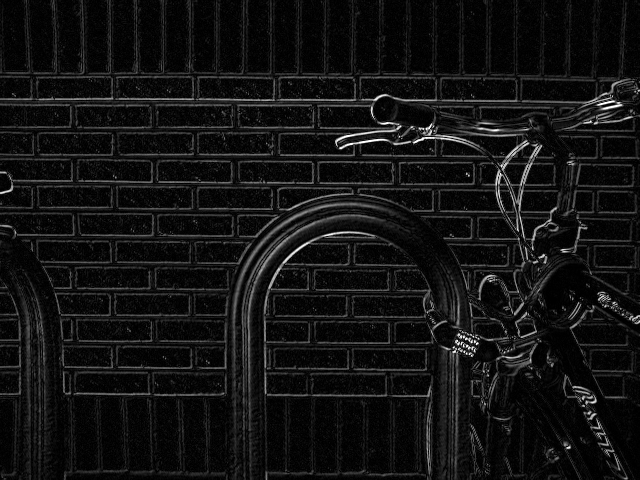
Edge detection using the Frei–Chen operator

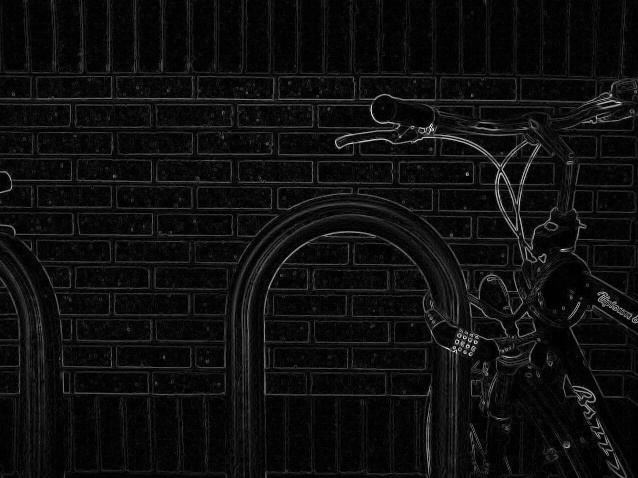
Edge detection using the Roberts cross operator

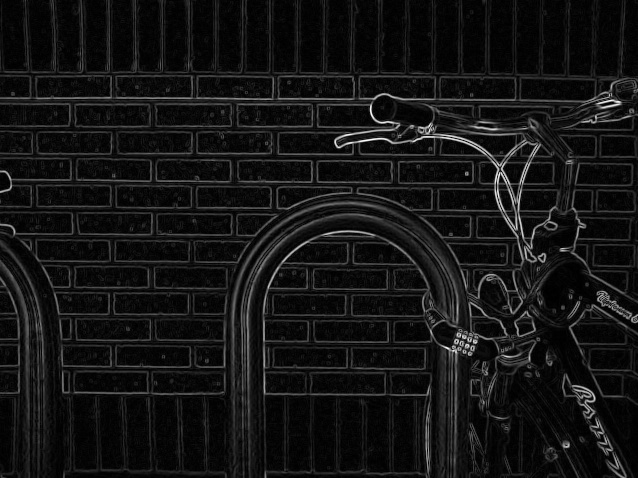
Edge detection using the Prewitt operator

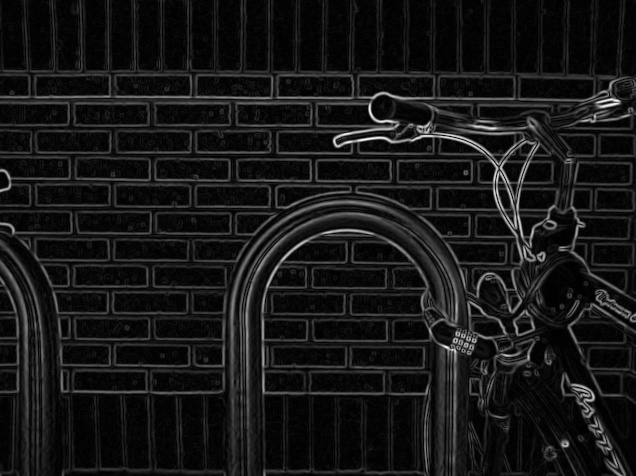
Edge detection using the Sobel operator

== See also ==
- Digital image processing
