= Non-compact stencil =

Type of discretization method

A 2D non-compact stencil

In numerical mathematics, a non-compact stencil is a type of discretization method, where any node surrounding the node of interest may be used in the calculation. Its computational time grows with an increase of layers of nodes used. Non-compact stencils may be compared to compact stencils.

== See also ==
- Nine-point stencil
- Five-point stencil
