= Compact stencil =

A 2D compact stencil using all 8 adjacent nodes, plus the center node (in red).

In mathematics, especially in the areas of numerical analysis called numerical partial differential equations, a compact stencil is a type of stencil that uses only nine nodes for its discretization method in two dimensions. It uses only the center node and the adjacent nodes. For any structured grid utilizing a compact stencil in 1, 2, or 3 dimensions the maximum number of nodes is 3, 9, or 27 respectively. Compact stencils may be compared to non-compact stencils. Compact stencils are implemented in many partial differential equation solvers, including several in the topics of CFD, FEA, and other mathematical solvers relating to PDEs

== Two point stencil example ==
The two point stencil for the first derivative of a function is given by:

$$f'(x_0) = \frac{f{\left(x_0{+}h\right)} - f{\left(x_0{-}h\right)}}{2h} + \mathcal{O}{\left(h^2\right)}.$$

This is obtained from the Taylor series expansion of the first derivative of the function given by:

$$f'(x_0)=\frac{f{\left(x_0{+}h\right)} - f(x_0)}{h} - \frac{f''(x_0)}{2!}h - \frac{f^{(3)}(x_0)}{3!}h^2 - \frac{f^{(4)}(x_0)}{4!}h^3 + \cdots.$$

Replacing $h$ with $-h$, we have:

$$f'(x_0) = -\frac{f{\left(x_0{-}h\right) }- f(x_0)}{h} + \frac{f''(x_0)}{2!}h - \frac{f^{(3)}(x_0)}{3!}h^2 + \frac{f^{(4)}(x_0)}{4!}h^3 + \cdots .$$

Addition of the above two equations together results in the cancellation of the terms in odd powers of $h$:

$$\begin{align}
2f'(x_0) &=
\frac{f{\left(x_0{+}h\right)} - f(x_0)}{h}
- \frac{f{\left(x_0{-}h\right)} - f(x_0)}{h}
-2\frac{f^{(3)}(x_0)}{3!}h^2 + \cdots
\\[1ex]
f'(x_0) &= \frac{f{\left(x_0{+}h\right)} - f{\left(x_0{-}h\right)}}{2h} - \frac{f^{(3)}(x_0)}{3!}h^2 + \cdots
\\
&=\frac{f{\left(x_0{+}h\right)} - f{\left(x_0{-}h\right)}}{2h} + \mathcal{O}{\left(h^2\right)}.
\end{align}$$

== Three point stencil example ==
For example, the three point stencil for the second derivative of a function is given by:

$$f''(x_0) = \frac{f{\left(x_0{+}h\right)} + f{\left(x_0{-}h\right)} - 2f(x_0)}{h^2} + \mathcal{O}{\left(h^2\right)}.$$

This is obtained from the Taylor series expansion of the first derivative of the function given by:
$$f'(x_0) = \frac{f{\left(x_0{+}h\right)} - f(x_0)}{h} -\frac{f''(x_0)}{2!}h - \frac{f^{(3)}(x_0)}{3!}h^2 - \frac{f^{(4)}(x_0)}{4!}h^3 + \cdots.$$

Replacing $h$ with $-h$, we have:
$$f'(x_0) = -\frac{f{\left(x_0{-}h\right)} - f(x_0)}{h} + \frac{f''(x_0)}{2!}h - \frac{f^{(3)}(x_0)}{3!}h^2 + \frac{f^{(4)}(x_0)}{4!}h^3 + \cdots .$$

Subtraction of the above two equations results in the cancellation of the terms in even powers of $h$:
$$\begin{align}
0 &= \frac{f{\left(x_0{+}h\right)} - f(x_0)}{h} + \frac{f{\left(x_0{-}h\right)} - f(x_0)}{h} - 2\frac{f^{(2)}(x_0)}{2!}h - 2\frac{f^{(4)}(x_0)}{4!}h^3 + \cdots. \\[1ex]
f^{(2)}(x_0) &= \frac{f{\left(x_0{+}h\right)} + f{\left(x_0{-}h\right)} - 2f(x_0)}{h^2} - 2\frac{f^{(4)}(x_0)}{4!}h^2 + \cdots. \\[1ex]
f^{(2)}(x_0) &= \frac{f{\left(x_0{+}h\right)} + f{\left(x_0{-}h\right)} - 2f(x_0)}{h^2} + \mathcal{O}{\left(h^2\right)}.
\end{align}$$

== See also ==
- Five-point stencil
- Nine-point stencil
