= Stencil jumping =

Stencil jumping, at times called stencil walking, is an algorithm to locate the grid element enclosing a given point for any structured mesh. In simple words, given a point and a structured mesh, this algorithm will help locate the grid element that will enclose the given point.

This algorithm finds extensive use in Computational Fluid Dynamics (CFD) in terms of holecutting and interpolation when two meshes lie one inside the other. The other variations of the problem would be something like this: Given a place, at which latitude and longitude does it lie? The brute force algorithm would find the distance of the point from every mesh point and see which is smallest. Another approach would be to use a binary search algorithm which would yield a result comparable in speed to the stencil jumping algorithm. A combination of both the binary search and the stencil jumping algorithm will yield an optimum result in the minimum possible time.

== The principle ==
The point O lies inside the grid element ABCD.

Consider one grid element of a 2-dimensional mesh as shown, for simplicity and consider a point O inside. The vertices of the grid element are denoted by A, B, C and D and the vectors AB, BC, CD, DA, OA, OB, OC and OD are represented. The cross product of OA and AB will yield a vector perpendicular to the plane coming out of the screen. We say that the magnitude of the cross product is positive. It will be observed that the cross products of OB and BC, OC and CD; and OD and DA are all positive.

The point O lies outside the grid element ABCD.

This is not the case when the point is outside. Here we see that not all the cross products are positive. This is the major testing criterion in the algorithm.

== How does it move forward? ==
The algorithm needs a guess grid element to start off. The grid element can be found by the location of one point say A. The other points can be automatically located by getting the subsequent points. The required cross products are then found in the order

1. OA × AB
2. OB × BC
3. OC × CD
4. OD × DA

Each of these cross products are checked one by one (in the order shown) on which becomes negative first. If OA × AB becomes negative first, the next guess should be one step ahead along DA. If OB × BC is negative first, move along AB by one step to find the next guess and so on.

The algorithm will converge at the exact grid element where all the cross products are positive.

== See also ==
- Five-point stencil
