= List of lemmas =

This following is a list of lemmas (or, "lemmata", i.e. minor theorems, or sometimes intermediate technical results factored out of proofs). See also list of axioms, list of theorems and list of conjectures.

== Algebra ==
- Abhyankar's lemma
- Aubin–Lions lemma
- Bergman's diamond lemma
- Fitting lemma
- Injective test lemma
- Hua's lemma (exponential sums)
- Krull's separation lemma
- Schanuel's lemma (projective modules)
- Schwartz–Zippel lemma
- Shapiro's lemma
- Stewart–Walker lemma (tensors)
- Whitehead's lemma (Lie algebras)
- Zariski's lemma

=== Algebraic geometry ===
- Abhyankar's lemma
- Fundamental lemma (Langlands program)

=== Category theory ===
A commutative diagram that illustrates the five lemma

- Five lemma
- Horseshoe lemma
- Nine lemma
- Short five lemma
- Snake lemma
- Splitting lemma
- Yoneda lemma

=== Linear algebra ===
- Matrix determinant lemma
- Matrix inversion lemma

=== Group theory ===
- Burnside's lemma also known as the Cauchy–Frobenius lemma
- Frattini's lemma (finite groups)
- Goursat's lemma
- Mautner's lemma (representation theory)
- Ping-pong lemma (geometric group theory)
- Schreier's subgroup lemma
- Schur's lemma (representation theory)
- Zassenhaus lemma

=== Polynomials ===
- Gauss's lemma (polynomials)
- Schwartz–Zippel lemma

=== Ring theory and commutative algebra ===
- Artin–Rees lemma
- Hensel's lemma (commutative rings)
- Nakayama lemma
- Noether's normalization lemma
- Prime avoidance lemma

=== Universal algebra ===
- Jónsson's lemma

== Analysis ==
- Fekete's lemma
- Fundamental lemma of the calculus of variations
- Hopf lemma
- Sard's lemma (singularity theory)
- Stechkin's lemma (functional and numerical analysis)
- Vitali covering lemma (real analysis)
- Watson's lemma

=== Complex analysis ===
- Estimation lemma (contour integrals)
- Hartogs's lemma (several complex variables)
- Jordan's lemma
- Lemma on the Logarithmic derivative
- Schwarz lemma

=== Fourier analysis ===
- Riemann–Lebesgue lemma

=== Differential equations ===
- Borel's lemma (partial differential equations)
- Grönwall's lemma
- Lax–Milgram lemma
- Pugh's closing lemma
- Weyl's lemma (Laplace equation) (partial differential equations)

=== Differential forms ===
- Poincaré lemma of closed and exact differential forms

=== Functional analysis ===
- Cotlar–Stein lemma
- Ehrling's lemma
- Riesz's lemma

=== Mathematical series ===
- Abel's lemma
- Kronecker's lemma

=== Numerical analysis ===
- Bramble–Hilbert lemma
- Céa's lemma

== Applied mathematics ==
diagram of a length-8 fast Fourier transform

- Danielson–Lanczos lemma (Fourier transforms)
- Farkas's lemma (linear programming)
- Feld–Tai lemma (electromagnetism)
- Little's lemma (queuing theory)
- Finsler's lemma

=== Control theory ===
- Finsler's lemma
- Hautus lemma
- Kalman–Yakubovich–Popov lemma

=== Computational complexity theory ===
- Isolation lemma
- Switching lemma

==== Cryptography ====
- Forking lemma
- Leftover hash lemma
- Piling-up lemma (linear cryptanalysis)
- Yao's XOR lemma

==== Formal languages ====
- Interchange lemma
- Newman's lemma (term rewriting)
- Ogden's lemma
- Pumping lemma sometimes called the Bar-Hillel lemma

=== Microeconomics ===
- Hotelling's lemma
- Shephard's lemma

== Combinatorics ==
- Cousin's lemma (integrals)
- Dickson's lemma
- Littlewood–Offord lemma
- Pólya–Burnside lemma
- Sperner's lemma
- Ky Fan lemma (combinatorial geometry)

=== Graph theory ===
- Berge's lemma
- Counting lemma
- Crossing lemma
- Expander mixing lemma
- Handshaking lemma
- Kelly's lemma
- Kőnig's lemma
- Szemerédi regularity lemma

=== Order theory ===
- Higman's lemma
- Ultrafilter lemma

== Dynamical systems ==
- Barbalat's lemma
- Kac's lemma (ergodic theory)

== Geometry ==
- Shadowing lemma
- Big-little-big lemma (mathematics of paper folding)
- Gordan's lemma
- Hilbert's lemma

=== Euclidean geometry ===
- Archimedes's lemmas
- Johnson–Lindenstrauss lemma (Euclidean geometry)

=== Hyperbolic geometry ===
- Margulis lemma

=== Metric spaces ===
- Lebesgue's number lemma (dimension theory)

=== Riemannian geometry ===
- Gauss's lemma (Riemannian geometry)

== Mathematical logic ==
- Craig interpolation lemma
- Diagonal lemma
- Lindenbaum's lemma
- Mostowski collapse lemma
- Teichmüller–Tukey lemma also known as Tukey's lemma
- Zorn's lemma; equivalent to the axiom of choice

=== Set theory ===
- Covering lemma
- Delta lemma
- Dynkin lemma
- Fodor's lemma
- Fixed-point lemma for normal functions (axiomatic set theory)
- Moschovakis coding lemma
- Rasiowa–Sikorski lemma

== Number theory ==
- Bézout's lemma
- Dwork's lemma
- Euclid's lemma
- Gauss's lemma
- Hensel's lemma
- Zolotarev's lemma
- Siegel's lemma (Diophantine approximation)

=== Analytic number theory ===
- Hua's lemma
- Vaughan's lemma

=== Diophantine equations ===
- Bhaskara's lemma

=== Sieve theory ===
- Fundamental lemma of sieve theory

== Probability theory ==
- Borel–Cantelli lemma
- Doob–Dynkin lemma
- Itô's lemma (stochastic calculus)
- Lovász local lemma
- Stein's lemma
- Wald's lemma

=== Statistics ===
- Glivenko–Cantelli lemma
- Neyman–Pearson lemma
- Robbins lemma

=== Measure theory ===
- Factorization lemma
- Fatou's lemma
- Frostman's lemma (geometric measure theory)
- Malliavin's absolute continuity lemma

== Topology ==
- Lindelöf's lemma
- Urysohn's lemma
- Tube lemma

=== Differential topology ===
- Morse lemma

=== Fixed-point theory ===
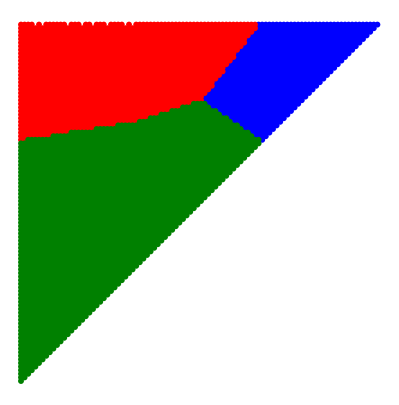
An example of a covering described by the Knaster–Kuratowski–Mazurkiewicz lemma

- Knaster–Kuratowski–Mazurkiewicz lemma

=== Geometric topology ===
- Dehn's lemma

=== Topological groups and semigroups ===
- Ellis–Numakura lemma (topological semigroups)
