= Sobolev spaces for planar domains =

In mathematics, Sobolev spaces for planar domains are one of the principal techniques used in the theory of partial differential equations for solving the Dirichlet and Neumann boundary value problems for the Laplacian in a bounded domain in the plane with smooth boundary. The methods use the theory of bounded operators on Hilbert space. They can be used to deduce regularity properties of solutions and to solve the corresponding eigenvalue problems.

== Sobolev spaces with boundary conditions ==
Let Ω ⊂ R^{2} be a bounded domain with smooth boundary. Since Ω is contained in a large square in R^{2}, it can be regarded as a domain in T^{2} by identifying opposite sides of the square. The theory of Sobolev spaces on T^{2} can be found in Bers, John & Schechter (1979), an account which is followed in several later textbooks such as Warner (1983) and Griffiths & Harris (1994).

For k an integer, the (restricted) Sobolev space H^{k}_{0}(Ω) is defined as the closure of C^{∞}_{c}(Ω) in the standard Sobolev space H^{k}(T^{2}).

- H^{0}_{0}(Ω) = L^{2}(Ω).
- Vanishing properties on boundary: For k > 0 the elements of H^{k}_{0}(Ω) are referred to as "L^{2} functions on Ω which vanish with their first k − 1 derivatives on ∂Ω." In fact if f ∈ C^{k}(Ω̅) agrees with a function in H^{k}_{0}(Ω), then g = ∂^{α}f is in C^{1}. Let f_{n} ∈ C^{∞}_{c}(Ω) be such that f_{n} → f in the Sobolev norm, and set g_{n} = ∂^{α}f_{n} . Thus g_{n} → g in H^{1}_{0}(Ω). Hence for h ∈ C^{∞}(T^{2}) and D = a∂_{x} + b∂_{y},

$$\iint_\Omega \left (g (Dh) + (Dg) h \right ) \, dx \, dy = \lim_{n\to 0} \iint_\Omega \left (g (Dh_n) + (Dg) h_n \right ) \, dx \, dy =0.$$

By Green's theorem this implies

$$\int_{\partial\Omega} gk =0,$$

where

$$k = h \cos \left (\mathbf{n} \cdot (a, b) \right ),$$

with n the unit normal to the boundary. Since such k form a dense subspace of L^{2}(Ω), it follows that g = 0 on ∂Ω.

- Support properties: Let Ω^{c} be the complement of Ω̅ and define restricted Sobolev spaces analogously for Ω^{c}. Both sets of spaces have a natural pairing with C^{∞}(T^{2}). The Sobolev space for Ω is the annihilator in the Sobolev space for T^{2} of C^{∞}_{c}(Ω^{c}) and that for Ω^{c} is the annihilator of C^{∞}_{c}(Ω). In fact this is proved by locally applying a small translation to move the domain inside itself and then smoothing by a smooth convolution operator.

Suppose g in H^{k}(T^{2}) annihilates C^{∞}_{c}(Ω^{c}). By compactness, there are finitely many open sets U_{0}, U_{1}, ... , U_{N} covering Ω̅ such that the closure of U_{0} is disjoint from ∂Ω and each U_{i} is an open disc about a boundary point z_{i} such that in U_{i} small translations in the direction of the normal vector n_{i} carry Ω̅ into Ω. Add an open U_{N+1} with closure in Ω^{c} to produce a cover of T^{2} and let ψ_{i} be a partition of unity subordinate to this cover. If translation by n is denoted by λ_{n}, then the functions

$$g_t=\psi_0 g +\sum_{i=1}^N \psi_n \lambda_{tn_i} g$$

tend to g as t decreases to 0 and still lie in the annihilator, indeed they are in the annihilator for a larger domain than Ω^{c}, the complement of which lies in Ω. Convolving by smooth functions of small support produces smooth approximations in the annihilator of a slightly smaller domain still with complement in Ω. These are necessarily smooth functions of compact support in Ω.

- Further vanishing properties on the boundary: The characterization in terms of annihilators shows that f ∈ C^{k}(Ω̅) lies in H^{k}_{0}(Ω) if (and only if) it and its derivatives of order less than k vanish on ∂Ω. In fact f can be extended to T^{2} by setting it to be 0 on Ω^{c}. This extension F defines an element in H^{k}(T^{2}) using the formula for the norm

$$\|h\|_{(k)}^2=\sum_{j=0}^k {k\choose j} \left  \|\partial_x^j\partial_y^{k-j} h \right\|^2.$$

Moreover F satisfies (F, g) = 0 for g in C^{∞}_{c}(Ω^{c}).

- Duality: For k ≥ 0, define H^{−k}(Ω) to be the orthogonal complement of H^{−k}_{0}(Ω^{c}) in H^{−k}(T^{2}). Let P_{k} be the orthogonal projection onto H^{−k}(Ω), so that Q_{k} = I − P_{k} is the orthogonal projection onto H^{−k}_{0}(Ω^{c}). When k = 0, this just gives H^{0}(Ω) = L^{2}(Ω). If f ∈ H^{k}_{0}(Ω^{c}) and g ∈ H^{−k}(T^{2}), then

$$(f,g)= (f, P_kg).$$

This implies that under the pairing between H^{k}(T^{2}) and H^{−k}(T^{2}), H^{k}_{0}(Ω^{c}) and H^{−k}(Ω) are each other's duals.

- Approximation by smooth functions: The image of C^{∞}_{c}(Ω) is dense in H^{−k}(Ω) for k ≤ 0. This is obvious for k = 0 since the sum C^{∞}_{c}(Ω) + C^{∞}_{c}(Ω^{c}) is dense in L^{2}(T^{2}). Density for k < 0 follows because the image of L^{2}(T^{2}) is dense in H^{−k}(T^{2}) and P_{k} annihilates C^{∞}_{c}(Ω^{c}).
- Canonical isometries: The operator (I + ∆)^{k} gives an isometry of H^{2k}_{0}(Ω) into H^{0}(Ω) and of H^{k}_{0}(Ω) onto H^{−k}(Ω). In fact the first statement follows because it is true on T^{2}. That (I + ∆)^{k} is an isometry on H^{k}_{0}(Ω) follows using the density of C^{∞}_{c}(Ω) in H^{−k}(Ω): for f, g ∈ C^{∞}_{c}(Ω) we have:

$$\begin{align}
\left \|P_k (I+\Delta)^k f \right \|_{(-k)} &= \sup_{\|g\|_{(-k)}=1} \left|\left ((I+\Delta)^kf,g \right )_{(-k)} \right | \\
&= \sup_{\|g\|_{(-k)}=1} |(f,g)| \\
&=\|f\|_{(k)}.
\end{align}$$

Since the adjoint map between the duals can by identified with this map, it follows that (I + ∆)^{k} is a unitary map.

== Application to Dirichlet problem ==
=== Invertibility of ∆ ===
The operator ∆ defines an isomorphism between H^{1}_{0}(Ω) and H^{−1}(Ω). In fact it is a Fredholm operator of index 0. The kernel of ∆ in H^{1}(T^{2}) consists of constant functions and none of these except zero vanish on the boundary of Ω. Hence the kernel of H^{1}_{0}(Ω) is (0) and ∆ is invertible.

In particular the equation ∆f = g has a unique solution in H^{1}_{0}(Ω) for g in H^{−1}(Ω).

=== Eigenvalue problem ===
Let T be the operator on L^{2}(Ω) defined by

$$T = R_1\Delta^{-1}R_0,$$

where R_{0} is the inclusion of L^{2}(Ω) in H^{−1}(Ω) and R_{1} of H^{1}_{0}(Ω) in L^{2}(Ω), both compact operators by Rellich's theorem. The operator T is compact and self-adjoint with (Tf, f ) > 0 for all f. By the spectral theorem, there is a complete orthonormal set of eigenfunctions f_{n} in L^{2}(Ω) with

$$Tf_n = \mu_nf_n, \qquad \mu_n >0, \mu_n \to 0.$$

Since μ_{n} > 0, f_{n} lies in H^{1}_{0}(Ω). Setting λ_{n} = μ_{−n}, the f_{n} are eigenfunctions of the Laplacian:

$$\Delta f_n = \lambda_n f_n,\qquad \lambda_n>0, \lambda_n\to \infty.$$

== Sobolev spaces without boundary condition ==
To determine the regularity properties of the eigenfunctions f_{n} and solutions of

$$\Delta f =u,\qquad u\in H^{-1}(\Omega), f\in H^1_0(\Omega),$$

enlargements of the Sobolev spaces H^{k}_{0}(Ω) have to be considered. Let C^{∞}(Ω^{−}) be the space of smooth functions on Ω which with their derivatives extend continuously to Ω̅. By Borel's lemma, these are precisely the restrictions of smooth functions on T^{2}. The Sobolev space H^{k}(Ω) is defined to the Hilbert space completion of this space for the norm

$$\|f\|_{(k)}^2 = \sum_{j=0}^k {k\choose j} \left \|\partial_x^j\partial_y^{k-j}f \right\|^2.$$

This norm agrees with the Sobolev norm on C^{∞}_{c}(Ω) so that H^{k}_{0}(Ω) can be regarded as a closed subspace of H^{k}(Ω). Unlike H^{k}_{0}(Ω), H^{k}(Ω) is not naturally a subspace of H^{k}(T^{2}), but the map restricting smooth functions from T^{2} to Ω̅ is continuous for the Sobolev norm so extends by continuity to a map ρ_{k} : H^{k}(T^{2}) → H^{k}(Ω).

- Invariance under diffeomorphism: Any diffeomorphism between the closures of two smooth domains induces an isomorphism between the Sobolev space. This is a simple consequence of the chain rule for derivatives.
- Extension theorem: The restriction of ρ_{k} to the orthogonal complement of its kernel defines an isomorphism onto H^{k}(Ω). The extension map E_{k} is defined to be the inverse of this map: it is an isomorphism (not necessarily norm preserving) of H^{k}(Ω) onto the orthogonal complement of H^{k}_{0}(Ω^{c}) such that ρ_{k} ∘ E_{k} = I. On C^{∞}_{c}(Ω), it agrees with the natural inclusion map. Bounded extension maps E_{k} of this kind from H^{k}(Ω) to H^{k}(T^{2}) were constructed first constructed by Hestenes and Lions. For smooth curves the Seeley extension theorem provides an extension which is continuous in all the Sobolev norms. A version of the extension which applies in the case where the boundary is just a Lipschitz curve was constructed by Calderón using singular integral operators and generalized by Stein (1970).

It is sufficient to construct an extension E for a neighbourhood of a closed annulus, since a collar around the boundary is diffeomorphic to an annulus I × T with I a closed interval in T. Taking a smooth bump function ψ with 0 ≤ ψ ≤ 1, equal to 1 near the boundary and 0 outside the collar, E(ψf ) + (1 − ψ) f will provide an extension on Ω. On the annulus, the problem reduces to finding an extension for C^{k}( I ) in C^{k}(T). Using a partition of unity the task of extending reduces to a neighbourhood of the end points of I. Assuming 0 is the left end point, an extension is given locally by

$$E(f) = \sum_{m=0}^k a_m f \left (-\frac{x}{m+1} \right ).$$

Matching the first derivatives of order k or less at 0, gives

$$\sum_{m=0}^k (-m-1)^{-k} a_m =1.$$

This matrix equation is solvable because the determinant is non-zero by Vandermonde's formula. It is straightforward to check that the formula for E( f ), when appropriately modified with bump functions, leads to an extension which is continuous in the above Sobolev norm.

- Restriction theorem: The restriction map ρ_{k} is surjective with ker ρ_{k} = H^{k}_{0}(Ω^{c}). This is an immediate consequence of the extension theorem and the support properties for Sobolev spaces with boundary condition.
- Duality: H^{k}(Ω) is naturally the dual of H^{−k}_{0}(Ω). Again this is an immediate consequence of the restriction theorem. Thus the Sobolev spaces form a chain:

$$\cdots \subset H^2(\Omega) \subset H^1(\Omega) \subset H^0(\Omega) \subset H^{-1}_0(\Omega) \subset H^{-2}_0(\Omega) \subset \cdots$$

The differentiation operators ∂_{x}, ∂_{y} carry each Sobolev space into the larger one with index 1 less.

- Sobolev embedding theorem: H^{k+2}(Ω) is contained in C^{k}(Ω^{−}). This is an immediate consequence of the extension theorem and the Sobolev embedding theorem for H^{k+2}(T^{2}).
- Characterization: H^{k}(Ω) consists of f in L^{2}(Ω) = H^{0}(Ω) such that all the derivatives ∂^{α}f lie in L^{2}(Ω) for |α| ≤ k. Here the derivatives are taken within the chain of Sobolev spaces above. Since C^{∞}_{c}(Ω) is weakly dense in H^{k}(Ω), this condition is equivalent to the existence of L^{2} functions f_{α} such that

$$\left(f_\alpha,\varphi \right)=(-1)^{|\alpha|} \left (f, \partial^\alpha \varphi \right ), \qquad |\alpha| \leq k, \varphi \in C^{\infty}_c(\Omega).$$

To prove the characterization, note that if f is in H^{k}(Ω), then ∂^{α}f lies in H^{k−|α|}(Ω) and hence in H^{0}(Ω) = L^{2}(Ω). Conversely the result is well known for the Sobolev spaces H^{k}(T^{2}): the assumption implies that the (∂_{x} − i∂_{y})^{k} f is in L^{2}(T^{2}) and the corresponding condition on the Fourier coefficients of f shows that f lies in H^{k}(T^{2}). Similarly the result can be proved directly for an annulus [−δ, δ] × T. In fact by the argument on T_{2} the restriction of f to any smaller annulus [−δ',δ'] × T lies in H^{k}: equivalently the restriction of the function f_{R} (x, y) = f (Rx, y) lies in H^{k} for R > 1. On the other hand ∂^{α} f_{R} → ∂^{α} f in L^{2} as R → 1, so that f must lie in H^{k}. The case for a general domain Ω reduces to these two cases since f can be written as f = ψf + (1 − ψ) f with ψ a bump function supported in Ω such that 1 − ψ is supported in a collar of the boundary.

- Regularity theorem: If f in L^{2}(Ω) has both derivatives ∂_{x} f and ∂_{y} f in H^{k}(Ω) then f lies in H^{k+1}(Ω). This is an immediate consequence of the characterization of H^{k}(Ω) above. In fact if this is true even when satisfied at the level of distributions: if there are functions g, h in H^{k}(Ω) such that (g,φ) = (f, φ_{x}) and (h,φ) = (f,φ_{y}) for φ in C^{∞}_{c}(Ω), then f is in H^{k+1}(Ω).
- Rotations on an annulus: For an annulus I × T, the extension map to T^{2} is by construction equivariant with respect to rotations in the second variable,

$$R_t f(x,y)=f(x,y+t).$$

On T^{2} it is known that if f is in H^{k}, then the difference quotient δ_{h} f = h^{−1}(R_{h} f − f ) → ∂_{y} f in H^{k−1}; if the difference quotients are bounded in H^{k} then ∂_{y}f lies in H^{k}. Both assertions are consequences of the formula:

$$\widehat{\delta_h f}(m,n) = h^{-1}(e^{-ihn}-1)\widehat{f}(m,n)=-\int_0^1 in e^{-inht}\, dt \,\,\widehat{f}(m,n).$$

These results on T^{2} imply analogous results on the annulus using the extension.

== Regularity for Dirichlet problem ==
=== Regularity for dual Dirichlet problem ===
If ∆u = f with u in H^{1}_{0}(Ω) and f in H^{k−1}(Ω) with k ≥ 0, then u lies in H^{k+1}(Ω).

Take a decomposition u = ψu + (1 − ψ)u with ψ supported in Ω and 1 − ψ supported in a collar of the boundary. Standard Sobolev theory for T^{2} can be applied to ψu: elliptic regularity implies that it lies in H^{k+1}(T^{2}) and hence H^{k+1}(Ω). v = (1 − ψ)u lies in H^{1}_{0} of a collar, diffeomorphic to an annulus, so it suffices to prove the result with Ω a collar and ∆ replaced by

$$\begin{align}
\Delta_1 &= \Delta -[\Delta,\psi] \\
&=\Delta + \left(p\partial_x + q\partial_y - \Delta \psi \right) \\
&=\Delta +X.
\end{align}$$

The proof proceeds by induction on k, proving simultaneously the inequality

$$\|u\|_{(k+1)} \le C\|\Delta_1 u\|_{(k-1)} + C \|u\|_{(k)},$$

for some constant C depending only on k. It is straightforward to establish this inequality for k = 0, where by density u can be taken to be smooth of compact support in Ω:

$$\begin{align}
\|u\|_{(1)}^2 &= |(\Delta u, u)| \\
&\le |(\Delta_1 u,u)| +|(Xu,u)| \\
&\le \|\Delta_1 u\|_{(-1)}\|u\|_{(1)} +C^\prime \|u\|_{(1)}\|u\|_{(0)}.
\end{align}$$

The collar is diffeomorphic to an annulus. The rotational flow R_{t} on the annulus induces a flow S_{t} on the collar with corresponding vector field Y = r∂_{x} + s∂_{y}. Thus Y corresponds to the vector field ∂_{θ}. The radial vector field on the annulus r∂_{r} is a commuting vector field which on the collar gives a vector field Z = p∂_{x} + q∂_{y} proportional to the normal vector field. The vector fields Y and Z commute.

The difference quotients δ_{h}u can be formed for the flow S_{t}. The commutators [δ_{h}, ∆_{1}] are second order differential operators from H^{k+1}(Ω) to H^{k−1}(Ω). Their operators norms are uniformly bounded for h near 0; for the computation can be carried out on the annulus where the commutator just replaces the coefficients of ∆_{1} by their difference quotients composed with S_{h}. On the other hand, v = δ_{h}u lies in H^{1}_{0}(Ω), so the inequalities for u apply equally well for v:

$$\begin{align}
\|\delta_h u\|_{(k+1)} &\le C\|\Delta_1 \delta_h u\|_{(k-1)} + C \|\delta_h u\|_{(k)} \\
&\le C \|\delta_h \Delta_1 u\|_{(k-1)} + C\|[\delta_h,\Delta_1] u\|_{(k-1)} + C \|\delta_h u\|_{(k)} \\
&\le C\|\Delta_1 u\|_{(k)} + C^\prime \|u\|_{(k+1)}.
\end{align}$$

The uniform boundedness of the difference quotients δ_{h}u implies that Yu lies in H^{k+1}(Ω) with

$$\|Y u\|_{(k+1)} \le C \|\Delta_1 u\|_{(k)} + C^\prime \|u\|_{(k+1)}.$$

It follows that Vu lies in H^{k+1}(Ω) where V is the vector field

$$V = \frac{Y}{\sqrt{r^2+s^2}} = a\partial_x + b\partial_y, \qquad a^2 + b^2 = 1.$$

Moreover, Vu satisfies a similar inequality to Yu.

$$\|V u\|_{(k+1)} \le C^{\prime\prime} \left (\|\Delta_1 u\|_{(k)} + \|u\|_{(k+1)} \right).$$

Let W be the orthogonal vector field

$$W=-b\partial_x + a\partial_y.$$

It can also be written as ξZ for some smooth nowhere vanishing function ξ on a neighbourhood of the collar.

It suffices to show that Wu lies in H^{k+1}(Ω). For then

$$(V \pm iW)u =(a \mp i b) \left (\partial_x \pm i \partial_y \right)u,$$

so that ∂_{x}u and ∂_{y}u lie in H^{k+1}(Ω) and u must lie in H^{k+2}(Ω).

To check the result on Wu, it is enough to show that VWu and W^{2}u lie in H^{k}(Ω). Note that

$$\begin{align}
A &=\Delta - V^2 - W^2, \\
B &=[V,W],
\end{align}$$

are vector fields. But then

$$\begin{align}
W^2u &=\Delta u - V^2u - Au, \\
VWu &= WVu + Bu,
\end{align}$$

with all terms on the right hand side in H^{k}(Ω). Moreover, the inequalities for Vu show that

$$\begin{align}
\|Wu\|_{(k+1)}  &\le C \left (\|VWu\|_{(k)} + \left \|W^2u \right \|_{(k)} \right ) \\
&\le C \left \| \left (\Delta - V^2 -A \right )u \right \|_{(k)} + C \|(WV+B)u\|_{(k)} \\
&\le C_1 \|\Delta_1 u\|_{(k)} + C_1 \|u\|_{(k+1)}.
\end{align}$$

Hence

$$\begin{align}
\|u\|_{(k+2)} &\le C \left (\|Vu\|_{(k+1)} + \|Wu\|_{(k+1)} \right ) \\
&\le C^\prime \|\Delta_1 u\|_{(k)} + C^\prime \|u\|_{(k+1)}.
\end{align}$$

=== Smoothness of eigenfunctions ===
It follows by induction from the regularity theorem for the dual Dirichlet problem that the eigenfunctions of ∆ in H^{1}_{0}(Ω) lie in C^{∞}(Ω^{−}). Moreover, any solution of ∆u = f with f in C^{∞}(Ω^{−}) and u in H^{1}_{0}(Ω) must have u in C^{∞}(Ω^{−}). In both cases by the vanishing properties, the eigenfunctions and u vanish on the boundary of Ω.

=== Solving the Dirichlet problem ===
The dual Dirichlet problem can be used to solve the Dirichlet problem:

$$\begin{cases}\Delta f|_\Omega = 0 \\ f|_{\partial\Omega} =g & g \in C^{\infty}(\partial \Omega)\end{cases}$$

By Borel's lemma g is the restriction of a function G in C^{∞}(Ω^{−}). Let F be the smooth solution of ∆F = ∆G with F = 0 on ∂Ω. Then f = G − F solves the Dirichlet problem. By the maximal principle, the solution is unique.

== Application to smooth Riemann mapping theorem ==
The solution to the Dirichlet problem can be used to prove a strong form of the Riemann mapping theorem for simply connected domains with smooth boundary. The method also applies to a region diffeomorphic to an annulus. For multiply connected regions with smooth boundary Schiffer & Hawley (1962) have given a method for mapping the region onto a disc with circular holes. Their method involves solving the Dirichlet problem with a non-linear boundary condition. They construct a function g such that:

- g is harmonic in the interior of Ω;
- On ∂Ω we have: ∂_{n}g = κ − Ke^{G}, where κ is the curvature of the boundary curve, ∂_{n} is the derivative in the direction normal to ∂Ω and K is constant on each boundary component.

Taylor (2011) gives a proof of the Riemann mapping theorem for a simply connected domain Ω with smooth boundary. Translating if necessary, it can be assumed that 0 ∈ Ω. The solution of the Dirichlet problem shows that there is a unique smooth function U(z) on Ω̅ which is harmonic in Ω and equals −log|z| on ∂Ω. Define the Green's function by G(z) = log|z| + U(z). It vanishes on ∂Ω and is harmonic on Ω away from 0. The harmonic conjugate V of U is the unique real function on Ω such that U + iV is holomorphic. As such it must satisfy the Cauchy–Riemann equations:

$$\begin{align}
U_x &= -V_y, \\
U_y &= V_x.
\end{align}$$

The solution is given by

$$V(z)=\int_0^z -U_y dx + V_x dy,$$

where the integral is taken over any path in Ω̅. It is easily verified that V_{x} and V_{y} exist and are given by the corresponding derivatives of U. Thus V is a smooth function on Ω̅, vanishing at 0. By the Cauchy-Riemann f = U + iV is smooth on Ω̅, holomorphic on Ω and f (0) = 0. The function H = arg z + V(z) is only defined up to multiples of 2π, but the function

$$F(z) =e^{G(z)+iH(z)}= z e^{f(z)}$$

is a holomorphic on Ω and smooth on Ω̅. By construction, F(0) = 0 and |F(z)| = 1 for z ∈ ∂Ω. Since z has winding number 1, so too does F(z). On the other hand, F(z) = 0 only for z = 0 where there is a simple zero. So by the argument principle F assumes every value in the unit disc, D, exactly once and F′ does not vanish inside Ω. To check that the derivative on the boundary curve is non-zero amounts to computing the derivative of e^{iH}, i.e. the derivative of H should not vanish on the boundary curve. By the Cauchy-Riemann equations these tangential derivative are up to a sign the directional derivative in the direction of the normal to the boundary. But G vanishes on the boundary and is strictly negative in Ω since |F| = e^{G}. The Hopf lemma implies that the directional derivative of G in the direction of the outward normal is strictly positive. So on the boundary curve, F has nowhere vanishing derivative. Since the boundary curve has winding number one, F defines a diffeomorphism of the boundary curve onto the unit circle. Accordingly, F : Ω̅ → D̅ is a smooth diffeomorphism, which restricts to a holomorphic map Ω → D and a smooth diffeomorphism between the boundaries.

Similar arguments can be applied to prove the Riemann mapping theorem for a doubly connected domain Ω bounded by simple smooth curves C_{i} (the inner curve) and C_{o} (the outer curve). By translating we can assume 1 lies on the outer boundary. Let u be the smooth solution of the Dirichlet problem with U = 0 on the outer curve and −1 on the inner curve. By the maximum principle 0 < u(z) < 1 for z in Ω and so by the Hopf lemma the normal derivatives of u are negative on the outer curve and positive on the inner curve. The integral of −u_{y}dx + u_{y}dx over the boundary is zero by Stokes' theorem so the contributions from the boundary curves cancel. On the other hand, on each boundary curve the contribution is the integral of the normal derivative along the boundary. So there is a constant c > 0 such that U = cu satisfies

$$\int_{C} \left (-U_y \,dx + U_x \, dy \right ) = 2\pi$$

on each boundary curve. The harmonic conjugate V of U can again be defined by

$$V(z)=\int_1^z -u_y \,dx + u_x \, dy$$

and is well-defined up to multiples of 2π. The function

$$\displaystyle{F(z)=e^{U(z) + i V(z)}}$$

is smooth on Ω̅ and holomorphic in Ω. On the outer curve |F| = 1 and on the inner curve |F| = e^{−c} = r < 1. The tangential derivatives on the outer curves are nowhere vanishing by the Cauchy-Riemann equations, since the normal derivatives are nowhere vanishing. The normalization of the integrals implies that F restricts to a diffeomorphism between the boundary curves and the two concentric circles. Since the images of outer and inner curve have winding number 1 and 0 about any point in the annulus, an application of the argument principle implies that F assumes every value within the annulus r < |z| < 1 exactly once; since that includes multiplicities, the complex derivative of F is nowhere vanishing in Ω. This F is a smooth diffeomorphism of Ω̅ onto the closed annulus r ≤ |z| ≤ 1, restricting to a holomorphic map in the interior and a smooth diffeomorphism on both boundary curves.

== Trace map ==
The restriction map τ : C^{∞}(T^{2}) → C^{∞}(T) = C^{∞}(1 × T) extends to a continuous map H^{k}(T^{2}) → H^{k − 1/2}(T) for k ≥ 1. In fact

$$\displaystyle{\widehat{\tau f}(n)=\sum_m \widehat{f}(m,n),}$$

so the Cauchy–Schwarz inequality yields

$$\begin{align}
\left |\widehat{\tau f}(n) \right|^2 \left (1+n^2 \right )^{k-\frac{1}{2}} &\le \left(\sum_m \frac{\left (1+n^2 \right)^{k-\frac{1}{2}}}{\left (1+m^2+n^2 \right )^{k}}\right) \left(\sum_m \left |\widehat{f}(m,n) \right |^2 \left (1+m^2+n^2 \right )^k\right) \\
&\le C_k \sum_m \left |\widehat{f}(m,n) \right |^2 \left (1+m^2+n^2 \right )^k,
\end{align}$$

where, by the integral test,

$$\begin{align}
C_k &= \sup_n \sum_m \frac{\left (1+n^2 \right )^{k-\frac{1}{2}}}{\left (1+m^2 +n^2 \right )^k} < \infty, \\
c_k &= \inf_n \sum_m \frac{\left (1+n^2 \right )^{k-\frac{1}{2}}}{\left (1+m^2 +n^2 \right )^k} > 0.
\end{align}$$

The map τ is onto since a continuous extension map E can be constructed from H^{k − 1/2}(T) to H^{k}(T^{2}). In fact set

$$\widehat{Eg}(m,n)=\lambda_{n}^{-1} \widehat{g}(n) \frac{\left (1+n^2 \right )^{k-\frac{1}{2}}}{\left (1+n^2+m^2 \right )^k},$$

where

$$\lambda_n=  \sum_m \frac{\left (1+n^2 \right )^{k-\frac{1}{2}}}{\left (1+m^2+n^2 \right )^k}.$$

Thus c_{k} < λ_{n} < C_{k}. If g is smooth, then by construction Eg restricts to g on 1 × T. Moreover, E is a bounded linear map since

$$\begin{align}
\|Eg\|_{(k)}^2 &= \sum_{m,n} \left |\widehat{Eg}(m,n) \right |^2 \left (1+m^2+n^2 \right ) \\
&\le c_k^{-2} \sum_{m,n} \left | \widehat{g}(n) \right |^2 \frac{\left (1+n^2 \right )^{2k-1}}{ \left (1+m^2+n^2 \right )^k} \\
&\le c_k^{-2} C_k \| g \|_{k-\frac{1}{2}}^2.
\end{align}$$

It follows that there is a trace map τ of H^{k}(Ω) onto H^{k − 1/2}(∂Ω). Indeed, take a tubular neighbourhood of the boundary and a smooth function ψ supported in the collar and equal to 1 near the boundary. Multiplication by ψ carries functions into H^{k} of the collar, which can be identified with H^{k} of an annulus for which there is a trace map. The invariance under diffeomorphisms (or coordinate change) of the half-integer Sobolev spaces on the circle follows from the fact that an equivalent norm on H^{k + 1/2}(T) is given by

$$\|f\|_{[k+\frac{1}{2}]}^2 = \|f\|_{(k)}^2 + \int_0^{2\pi}\int_0^{2\pi} \frac{\left |f^{(k)}(s)-f^{(k)}(t) \right |^2}{\left |e^{is} -e^{it} \right|^2} \,ds\, dt.$$

It is also a consequence of the properties of τ and E (the "trace theorem"). In fact any diffeomorphism f of T induces a diffeomorphism F of T^{2} by acting only on the second factor. Invariance of H^{k}(T^{2}) under the induced map F* therefore implies invariance of H^{k − 1/2}(T) under f*, since f* = τ ∘ F* ∘ E.

Further consequences of the trace theorem are the two exact sequences

$$(0) \to H^1_0(\Omega) \to H^1(\Omega) \to H^{\frac{1}{2}} (\partial\Omega) \to (0)$$

and

$$(0) \to H^2_0(\Omega) \to H^2(\Omega) \to H^{\frac{3}{2}} (\partial\Omega) \oplus H^{\frac{1}{2}}(\partial\Omega) \to (0),$$

where the last map takes f in H^{2}(Ω) to f|_{∂Ω} and ∂_{n}f|_{∂Ω}. There are generalizations of these sequences to H^{k}(Ω) involving higher powers of the normal derivative in the trace map:

$$(0)\to H^k_0(\Omega) \to H^k(\Omega) \to \bigoplus_{j=1}^k H^{j-\frac{1}{2}}(\partial\Omega) \to (0).$$

The trace map to H^{j − 1/2}(∂Ω) takes f to ∂^{k − j}_{n}f |_{∂Ω}

== Abstract formulation of boundary value problems ==
The Sobolev space approach to the Neumann problem cannot be phrased quite as directly as that for the Dirichlet problem. The main reason is that for a function f in H^{1}(Ω), the normal derivative ∂_{n}f |_{∂Ω} cannot be a priori defined at the level of Sobolev spaces. Instead an alternative formulation of boundary value problems for the Laplacian Δ on a bounded region Ω in the plane is used. It employs Dirichlet forms, sesqulinear bilinear forms on H^{1}(Ω), H^{1}_{0}(Ω) or an intermediate closed subspace. Integration over the boundary is not involved in defining the Dirichlet form. Instead, if the Dirichlet form satisfies a certain positivity condition, termed coerciveness, solution can be shown to exist in a weak sense, so-called "weak solutions". A general regularity theorem than implies that the solutions of the boundary value problem must lie in H^{2}(Ω), so that they are strong solutions and satisfy boundary conditions involving the restriction of a function and its normal derivative to the boundary. The Dirichlet problem can equally well be phrased in these terms, but because the trace map f |_{∂Ω} is already defined on H^{1}(Ω), Dirichlet forms do not need to be mentioned explicitly and the operator formulation is more direct. A unified discussion is given in Folland (1995) and briefly summarised below. It is explained how the Dirichlet problem, as discussed above, fits into this framework. Then a detailed treatment of the Neumann problem from this point of view is given following Taylor (2011).

The Hilbert space formulation of boundary value problems for the Laplacian Δ on a bounded region Ω in the plane proceeds from the following data:

- A closed subspace H^{1}_{0}(Ω) ⊆ H ⊆ H^{1}(Ω).
- A Dirichlet form for Δ given by a bounded Hermitian bilinear form D( f, g) defined for f, g ∈ H^{1}(Ω) such that D( f, g) = (∆f, g) for f, g ∈ H^{1}_{0}(Ω).
- D is coercive, i.e. there is a positive constant C and a non-negative constant λ such that D( f, f ) ≥ C ( f, f )_{(1)} − λ( f, f ).

A weak solution of the boundary value problem given initial data f in L^{2}(Ω) is a function u satisfying

$$D(f,g)=(u,g)$$

for all g.

For both the Dirichlet and Neumann problem

$$D(f,g) = \left (f_x, g_x \right ) + \left (f_y, g_y \right ).$$

For the Dirichlet problem H = H^{1}_{0}(Ω). In this case

$$D(f,g) = (\Delta f,g), \qquad f, g \in H.$$

By the trace theorem the solution satisfies u|_{Ω} = 0 in H^{1/2}(∂Ω).

For the Neumann problem H is taken to be H^{1}(Ω).

== Application to Neumann problem ==
The classical Neumann problem on Ω consists in solving the boundary value problem

$$\begin{cases}
\Delta u =f, & f, u \in C^{\infty}(\Omega^-),\\
\partial_n u =0 & \text{on } \partial \Omega
\end{cases}$$

Green's theorem implies that for u, v ∈ C^{∞}(Ω^{−})

$$(\Delta u,v)= (u_x,v_x) + (u_y,v_y) - (\partial_n u,v)_{\partial \Omega}.$$

Thus if Δu = 0 in Ω and satisfies the Neumann boundary conditions, u_{x} = u_{y} = 0, and so u is constant in Ω.

Hence the Neumann problem has a unique solution up to adding constants.

Consider the Hermitian form on H^{1}(Ω) defined by

$$\displaystyle{D(f,g)=(u_x,v_x) + (u_y,v_y).}$$

Since H^{1}(Ω) is in duality with H^{−1}_{0}(Ω), there is a unique element Lu in H^{−1}_{0}(Ω) such that

$$\displaystyle{D(u,v) =(Lu,v).}$$

The map I + L is an isometry of H^{1}(Ω) onto H^{−1}_{0}(Ω), so in particular L is bounded.

In fact

$$((L+I)u,v)=(u,v)_{(1)}.$$

So

$$\|(L+I)u\|_{(-1)} =\sup_{\|v\|_{(1)}=1} |((L+I)u,v)|= \sup_{\|v\|_{(1)}=1} |(u,v)_{(1)}|=\|u\|_{(1)}.$$

On the other hand, any f in H^{−1}_{0}(Ω) defines a bounded conjugate-linear form on H^{1}(Ω) sending v to ( f, v). By the Riesz–Fischer theorem, there exists u ∈ H^{1}(Ω) such that

$$\displaystyle{(f,v)=(u,v)_{(1)}.}$$

Hence (L + I)u = f and so L + I is surjective. Define a bounded linear operator T on L^{2}(Ω) by

$$T=R_1(I+L)^{-1} R_0,$$

where R_{1} is the map H^{1}(Ω) → L^{2}(Ω), a compact operator, and R_{0} is the map L^{2}(Ω) → H^{−1}_{0}(Ω), its adjoint, so also compact.

The operator T has the following properties:

- T is a contraction since it is a composition of contractions
- T is compact, since R_{0} and R_{1} are compact by Rellich's theorem
- T is self-adjoint, since if f, g ∈ L^{2}(Ω), they can be written f = (L + I)u, g = (L + I)v with u, v ∈ H^{1}(Ω) so

$$(Tf,g)=(u,(I+L)v)=(u,v)_{(1)}=((I+L)u,v)= (f,Tg).$$

- T has positive spectrum and kernel (0), for

$$(Tf,f)=(u,u)_{(1)}\ge 0,$$

and Tf = 0 implies u = 0 and hence f = 0.

- There is a complete orthonormal basis f_{n} of L^{2}(Ω) consisting of eigenfunctions of T. Thus

$$Tf_n=\mu_nf_n$$

with 0 < μ_{n} ≤ 1 and μ_{n} decreasing to 0.

- The eigenfunctions all lie in H^{1}(Ω) since the image of T lies in H^{1}(Ω).
- The f_{n} are eigenfunctions of L with

$$\displaystyle{Lf_n=\lambda_nf_n, \qquad \lambda_n=\mu_n^{-1} -1.}$$

Thus λ_{n} are non-negative and increase to ∞.

- The eigenvalue 0 occurs with multiplicity one and corresponds to the constant function. For if u ∈ H^{1}(Ω) satisfies Lu = 0, then

$$(u_x,u_x) + (u_y,u_y) = (Lu,u) = 0,$$

so u is constant.

== Regularity for Neumann problem ==
=== Weak solutions are strong solutions ===
The first main regularity result shows that a weak solution expressed in terms of the operator L and the Dirichlet form D is a strong solution in the classical sense, expressed in terms of the Laplacian Δ and the Neumann boundary conditions. Thus if u = Tf with u ∈ H^{1}(Ω), f ∈ L^{2}(Ω), then u ∈ H^{2}(Ω), satisfies Δu + u = f and ∂_{n}u|_{∂Ω} = 0. Moreover, for some constant C independent of u,

$$\|u\|_{(2)} \le C\|\Delta u\|_{(0)} + C \|u\|_{(1)}.$$

Note that

$$\|u\|_{(1)} \le \|L u\|_{(-1)} +  \|u\|_{(0)},$$

since

$$\begin{align}
\|u\|_{(1)}^2 &=|(L u, u)| +\|u\|^2_{(0)}  \\
&\le \|L u\|_{(-1)} \|u\|_{(1)} + \|u\|_{(0)} \|u\|_{(1)}.
\end{align}$$

Take a decomposition u = ψu + (1 − ψ)u with ψ supported in Ω and 1 − ψ supported in a collar of the boundary.

The operator L is characterized by

$$(Lf,g)= \left (f_x, g_x \right )+ \left (f_y, g_y \right )= (\Delta f, g)_\Omega - \left (\partial_n f, g \right )_{\partial\Omega}, \qquad f,g \in C^{\infty}(\Omega^-).$$

Then

$$([L,\psi]f,g)=([\Delta,\psi]f,g),$$

so that

$$\displaystyle{[L,\psi]=-[L,1-\psi]=\Delta\psi +2\psi_x\partial_x + 2\psi_y\partial_y.}$$

The function v = ψu and w = (1 − ψ)u are treated separately, v being essentially subject to usual elliptic regularity considerations for interior points while w requires special treatment near the boundary using difference quotients. Once the strong properties are established in terms of ∆ and the Neumann boundary conditions, the "bootstrap" regularity results can be proved exactly as for the Dirichlet problem.

==== Interior estimates ====
The function v = ψu lies in H^{1}_{0}(Ω_{1}) where Ω_{1} is a region with closure in Ω. If f ∈ C^{∞}_{c}(Ω) and g ∈ C^{∞}(Ω^{−})

$$(Lf,g) = (\Delta f,g)_\Omega.$$

By continuity the same holds with f replaced by v and hence Lv = ∆v. So

$$\Delta v= Lv=L(\psi u) =\psi Lu +[L,\psi]u=\psi(f-u) +[\Delta,\psi]u.$$

Hence regarding v as an element of H^{1}(T^{2}), ∆v ∈ L^{2}(T^{2}). Hence v ∈ H^{2}(T^{2}). Since v = φv for φ ∈ C^{∞}_{c}(Ω), we have v ∈ H^{2}_{0}(Ω). Moreover,

$$\|v\|_{(2)}^2 = \|\Delta v\|^2 + 2\|v\|_{(1)}^2,$$

so that

$$\|v\|_{(2)} \le C \left ( \|\Delta(v)\|+  \|v\|_{(1)} \right ).$$

==== Boundary estimates ====
The function w = (1 − ψ)u is supported in a collar contained in a tubular neighbourhood of the boundary. The difference quotients δ_{h}w can be formed for the flow S_{t} and lie in H^{1}(Ω), so the first inequality is applicable:

$$\begin{align}
\|\delta_h w\|_{(1)} &\le \|L \delta_h w\|_{(-1)} +  \|\delta_h w\|_{(0)} \\
&\le \|[L, \delta_h] w\|_{(-1)} +\|\delta_h Lw\|_{(-1)} + \| \delta_h w\|_{(0)} \\
&\le\|[L, \delta_h] w\|_{(-1)} +C\|Lw\|_{(0)}  +  C\| w\|_{(1)}.
\end{align}$$

The commutators [L, δ_{h}] are uniformly bounded as operators from H^{1}(Ω) to H^{−1}_{0}(Ω). This is equivalent to checking the inequality

$$\left| \left( \left [L,\delta_h \right] g,h\right)\right| \le A\|g\|_{(1)}\|h\|_{(1)},$$

for g, h smooth functions on a collar. This can be checked directly on an annulus, using invariance of Sobolev spaces under dffeomorphisms and the fact that for the annulus the commutator of δ_{h} with a differential operator is obtained by applying the difference operator to the coefficients after having applied R_{h} to the function:

$$\left [ \delta^h, \sum a_\alpha \partial^\alpha \right ] = \left (\delta^h(a_\alpha)\circ R_h \right ) \partial^\alpha.$$

Hence the difference quotients δ_{h}w are uniformly bounded, and therefore Yw ∈ H^{1}(Ω) with

$$\|Y w\|_{(1)} \le C\|L w\|_{(0)} + C^\prime \|w\|_{(1)}.$$

Hence Vw ∈ H^{1}(Ω) and Vw satisfies a similar inequality to Yw:

$$\|V w\|_{(1)} \le C^{\prime\prime} \left ( \|L w\|_{(0)} + \|w\|_{(1)} \right ).$$

Let W be the orthogonal vector field. As for the Dirichlet problem, to show that w ∈ H^{2}(Ω), it suffices to show that Ww ∈ H^{1}(Ω).

To check this, it is enough to show that VWw, W^{2}u ∈ L^{2}(Ω). As before

$$\begin{align}
A &= \Delta - V^2 - W^2\\
B &= [V,W]
\end{align}$$

are vector fields. On the other hand, (Lw, φ) = (∆w, φ) for φ ∈ C^{∞}_{c}(Ω), so that Lw and ∆w define the same distribution on Ω. Hence

$$\begin{align}
\left (W^2w, \varphi \right ) &= \left (L w - V^2w - Au,\varphi \right ),\\
(VWw,\varphi) &=(WVw + Bw,\varphi).
\end{align}$$

Since the terms on the right hand side are pairings with functions in L^{2}(Ω), the regularity criterion shows that Ww ∈ H^{2}(Ω). Hence Lw = ∆w since both terms lie in L^{2}(Ω) and have the same inner products with φ's.

Moreover, the inequalities for Vw show that

$$\begin{align}
\|Ww\|_{(1)} & \le C \left (\|VWw\|_{(0)} + \left \|W^2w \right \|_{(0)} \right ) \\
&\le C \left \| \left ( \Delta - V^2 -A \right )w \right \|_{(0)} + C \|(WV+B)w\|_{(0)} \\
&\le C_1 \|L w\|_{(0)} + C_1 \|w\|_{(1)}.
\end{align}$$

Hence

$$\begin{align}
\|w\|_{(2)} &\le C \left ( \|V w\|_{(1)} + \|W w\|_{(1)} \right ) \\
&\le C^\prime \|\Delta w \|_{(0)} + C^\prime \| w \|_{(1)}.
\end{align}$$

It follows that u = v + w ∈ H^{2}(Ω). Moreover,

$$\begin{align}
\|u\|_{(2)} &\le C \left ( \|\Delta v\| +\|\Delta w\| + \|v\|_{(1)} + \|w\|_{(1)} \right ) \\
&\le C^\prime \left ( \|\psi\Delta u\| + \|(1-\psi)\Delta u\| + 2\|[\Delta, \psi] u\| +\|u\|_{(1)} \right ) \\
&\le C^{\prime\prime} \left (\|\Delta u\| + \|u\|_{(1)} \right ).
\end{align}$$

==== Neumann boundary conditions ====
Since u ∈ H^{2}(Ω), Green's theorem is applicable by continuity. Thus for v ∈ H^{1}(Ω),

$$\begin{align}
(f,v) &= (Lu,v) + (u,v) \\
&= (u_x,v_x) + (u_y,v_y) +(u,v) \\
&= ((\Delta+I)u,v) +(\partial_{n} u,v)_{\partial\Omega} \\
&= (f,v) + (\partial_{n} u,v)_{\partial\Omega}.
\end{align}$$

Hence the Neumann boundary conditions are satisfied:

$$\partial_n u|_{\partial \Omega} = 0,$$

where the left hand side is regarded as an element of H^{1/2}(∂Ω) and hence L^{2}(∂Ω).

=== Regularity of strong solutions ===
The main result here states that if u ∈ H^{k+1} (k ≥ 1), ∆u ∈ H^{k} and ∂_{n}u|_{∂Ω} = 0, then u ∈ H^{k+2} and

$$\|u\|_{(k+2)} \le C\|\Delta u\|_{(k)} + C \|u\|_{(k+1)},$$

for some constant independent of u.

Like the corresponding result for the Dirichlet problem, this is proved by induction on k ≥ 1. For k = 1, u is also a weak solution of the Neumann problem so satisfies the estimate above for k = 0. The Neumann boundary condition can be written

$$Zu|_{\partial\Omega}=0.$$

Since Z commutes with the vector field Y corresponding to the period flow S_{t}, the inductive method of proof used for the Dirichlet problem works equally well in this case: for the difference quotients δ^{h} preserve the boundary condition when expressed in terms of Z.

==== Smoothness of eigenfunctions ====
It follows by induction from the regularity theorem for the Neumann problem that the eigenfunctions of D in H^{1}(Ω) lie in C^{∞}(Ω^{−}). Moreover, any solution of Du = f with f in C^{∞}(Ω^{−}) and u in H^{1}(Ω) must have u in C^{∞}(Ω^{−}). In both cases by the vanishing properties, the normal derivatives of the eigenfunctions and u vanish on ∂Ω.

==== Solving the associated Neumann problem ====
The method above can be used to solve the associated Neumann boundary value problem:

$$\begin{cases} \Delta f|_\Omega = 0 \\ \partial_n f|_{\partial\Omega} = g & g \in C^{\infty}(\partial \Omega)\end{cases}$$

By Borel's lemma g is the restriction of a function G ∈ C^{∞}(Ω^{−}). Let F be a smooth function such that ∂_{n}F = G near the boundary. Let u be the solution of ∆u = −∆F with ∂_{n}u = 0. Then f = u + F solves the boundary value problem.
