= Stewart Walker (disambiguation) =

Stewart Walker is a music producer.

Stewart Walker may also refer to:

- A. Stewart Walker (1876–1952), architect
- Stewart–Walker lemma

== See also ==
- Stuart Walker (disambiguation)
