= Stuart Walker =

Stuart Walker may refer to:

- Stuart H. Walker (1923–2018), American sailboat racer, professor of pediatrics and writer of sports books
- Stuart Walker (director) (1888–1941), American film producer and director
- Stuart Walker (footballer) (born 1951), English former goalkeeper
- Stuart Walker (cricketer) (born 1976), Zimbabwean cricketer
- Stuart Walker (designer) (1932–2023), British film and television designer
- Stuart Walker, Canadian singer from The Reklaws, songwriter

== See also ==
- Stewart Walker (disambiguation)
