= S-procedure =

The S-procedure or S-lemma is a mathematical result that gives conditions under which a particular quadratic inequality is a consequence of another quadratic inequality. The S-procedure was developed independently in a number of different contexts and has applications in control theory, linear algebra and mathematical optimization.

== Statement of the S-procedure ==
Let F_{1} and F_{2} be symmetric matrices, g_{1} and g_{2} be vectors and h_{1} and h_{2} be real numbers. Assume that there is some x_{0} such that the strict inequality $x_0^T F_1 x_0 + 2g_1^T x_0 + h_1 < 0$ holds. Then the implication

$$x^T F_1 x + 2g_1^T x + h_1 \le 0 \Longrightarrow x^T F_2 x + 2g_2^T x + h_2 \le 0$$

holds if and only if there exists some nonnegative number λ such that

$$\lambda \begin{bmatrix} F_1 & g_1 \\ g_1^T & h_1 \end{bmatrix} - \begin{bmatrix} F_2 & g_2 \\ g_2^T & h_2 \end{bmatrix}$$

is positive semidefinite.

== See also ==
- Linear matrix inequality
- Finsler's lemma
