= Hopf maximum principle =

The Hopf maximum principle is a maximum principle in the theory of second order elliptic partial differential equations and has been described as the "classic and bedrock result" of that theory. Generalizing the maximum principle for harmonic functions which was already known to Gauss in 1839, Eberhard Hopf proved in 1927 that if a function satisfies a second order partial differential inequality of a certain kind in a domain of R^{n} and attains a maximum in the domain then the function is constant. The simple idea behind Hopf's proof, the comparison technique he introduced for this purpose, has led to an enormous range of important applications and generalizations.

== Mathematical formulation ==
Let u = u(x), x = (x_{1}, ..., x_{n}) be a C^{2} function which satisfies the differential inequality

$$Lu = \sum_{ij} a_{ij}(x)\frac{\partial^2 u}{\partial x_i\partial x_j} +
\sum_i b_i(x)\frac{\partial u}{\partial x_i} \geq 0$$

in an open domain (connected open subset of R^{n}) Ω, where the symmetric matrix a_{ij} = a_{ji}(x) is locally uniformly positive definite in Ω and the coefficients a_{ij}, b_{i} are locally bounded. If u takes a maximum value M in Ω then u ≡ M.

The coefficients a_{ij}, b_{i} are just functions. If they are known to be continuous then it is sufficient to demand pointwise positive definiteness of a_{ij} on the domain.

It is usually thought that the Hopf maximum principle applies only to linear differential operators L. In particular, this is the point of view taken by Courant and Hilbert's Methoden der mathematischen Physik. In the later sections of his original paper, however, Hopf considered a more general situation which permits certain nonlinear operators L and, in some cases, leads to uniqueness statements in the Dirichlet problem for the mean curvature operator and the Monge–Ampère equation.

== Boundary behaviour ==
If the domain $\Omega$ has the interior sphere property (for example, if $\Omega$ has a smooth boundary), slightly more can be said. If in addition to the assumptions above, $u\in C^1(\overline{\Omega})$ and u takes a maximum value M at a point x_{0} in $\partial\Omega$, then for any outward direction ν at x_{0}, there holds $\frac{\partial u}{\partial \nu}(x_0)>0$ unless $u\equiv M$.
