= Eberhard Hopf =

German mathematician

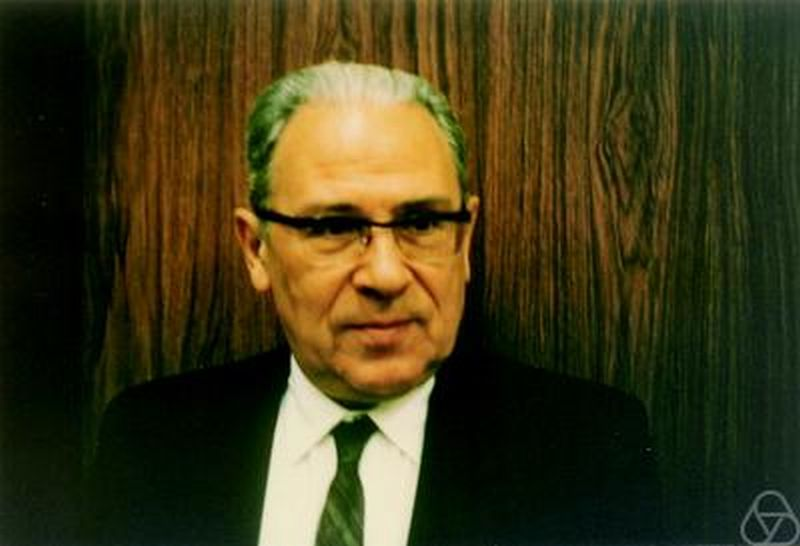
- Born: 4 April 1902; Salzburg, Austria-Hungary
- Died: 24 July 1983 (aged 81); Bloomington, Indiana, United States
- Education: Friedrich Wilhelm University of Berlin
- Known for: Bifurcation theory Differential geometry Ergodic theory Partial differential equation Hopf bifurcation Hopf decomposition Hopf lemma Hopf maximum principle Cole–Hopf transformation Landau–Hopf theory of turbulence Wiener–Hopf method
- Awards: Leroy P. Steele Prize (1981); Gibbs Lecture (1971); ICM speaker (1950)
- Scientific career
- Fields: Mathematician
- Workplaces: MIT (1931-36); Leipzig University (1936-42); Ludwig-Maximilians-Universität München (1944-47); Indiana University Bloomington (1949-83)
- Doctoral advisor: Erhard Schmidt; Issai Schur
- Doctoral students: Albert Schaeffer

Eberhard Frederich Ferdinand Hopf (April 4, 1902 – July 24, 1983) was a German mathematician and astronomer, one of the founding fathers of ergodic theory and a pioneer of bifurcation theory who also made significant contributions to the subjects of partial differential equations and integral equations, fluid dynamics, and differential geometry. The Hopf maximum principle is an early result of his (1927) that is one of the most important techniques in the theory of elliptic partial differential equations.

== Biography ==
Hopf was born in Salzburg, Austria-Hungary, but his scientific career was divided between Germany and the United States. He received his Ph.D. in mathematics in 1926 and his Habilitation in mathematical astronomy from the Friedrich Wilhelm University of Berlin in 1929.

In 1971, Hopf was the American Mathematical Society Gibbs Lecturer. In 1981, he received the Leroy P. Steele Prize from the American Mathematical Society for seminal contributions to research.

== Major publications ==
- Hopf, E. (1927). "Elementare Bemerkungen über die Lösungen partieller Differentialgleichungen zweiter Ordnung vom elliptischen Typus". Sitzungsberichte der Preußischen Akademie der Wissenschaften, Physikalisch-Mathematische Klasse (in German): 147–152. JFM 53.0454.02.
- Hopf, Eberhard (1932). "Über den funktionalen, insbesondere den analytischen Charakter der Lösungen elliptischer Differentialgleichungen zweiter Ordnung". Mathematische Zeitschrift (in German). 34: 194–233. doi:10.1007/BF01180586. JFM 57.0556.01. S2CID 120040877. Zbl 0002.34003.
- Hopf, Eberhard (1939). "Statistik der geodätischen Linien in Mannigfaltigkeiten negativer Krümmung". Berichte über die Verhandlungen der Sächsischen Akademie der Wissenschaften zu Leipzig. Mathematisch-Physische Klasse (in German). 91: 261–304. JFM 65.1413.02. MR 0001464. Zbl 0024.08003.
- Hopf, Eberhard (1943). "Abzweigung einer periodischen Lösung von einer stationären eines Differentialsystems". Berichte über die Verhandlungen der Sächsischen Akademie der Wissenschaften zu Leipzig. Mathematisch-Physische Klasse (in German). 95 (1): 3–22. MR 0039141. Zbl 0063.02065.
- Hopf, Eberhard (1948a). "A mathematical example displaying features of turbulence". Communications on Pure and Applied Mathematics. 1 (4): 303–322. doi:10.1002/cpa.3160010401. MR 0030113. Zbl 0031.32901.
- Hopf, Eberhard (1948b). "Closed surfaces without conjugate points". Proceedings of the National Academy of Sciences of the United States of America. 34 (2): 47–51. Bibcode:1948PNAS...34...47H. doi:10.1073/pnas.34.2.47. MR 0023591. PMC 1062913. PMID 16588785. Zbl 0030.07901.
- Hopf, Eberhard (1950). "The partial differential equation u_{t} + uu_{x} = μu_{xx}". Communications on Pure and Applied Mathematics. 3 (3): 201–230. doi:10.1002/cpa.3160030302. MR 0047234. Zbl 0039.10403.
- Hopf, Eberhard (1951). "Über die Anfangswertaufgabe für die hydrodynamischen Grundgleichungen". Mathematische Nachrichten (in German). 4 (1–6): 213–231. doi:10.1002/mana.3210040121. MR 0050423. Zbl 0042.10604.
- Hopf, Eberhard (1952a). "A remark on linear elliptic differential equations of second order". Proceedings of the American Mathematical Society. 3 (5): 791–793. doi:10.1090/S0002-9939-1952-0050126-X. MR 0050126. Zbl 0048.07802.
- Hopf, Eberhard (1952b). "Statistical hydromechanics and functional calculus". Journal of Rational Mechanics and Analysis. 1 (1): 87–123. doi:10.1512/iumj.1952.1.51004. MR 0059119. Zbl 0049.41704.
- Hopf, Eberhard (1965). "Generalized solutions of non-linear equations of first order". Journal of Mathematics and Mechanics. 14 (6): 951–973. JSTOR 24901315. MR 0182790. Zbl 0168.35101.

A non-comprehensive selection of his work was published in 2002:

- Morawetz, Cathleen S.; Serrin, James B.; Sinai, Yakov G., eds. (2002). Selected works of Eberhard Hopf with commentaries. Collected Works. Vol. 17. Providence, RI: American Mathematical Society. ISBN 978-0-8218-2077-3. MR 1985954. S2CID 117548743. Zbl 1011.01017.
