= Linear matrix inequality =

Mathematical convex optimization

In convex optimization, a linear matrix inequality (LMI) is an expression of the form

$$\operatorname{LMI}(y):=A_0+y_1A_1+y_2A_2+\cdots+y_m A_m\succeq 0\,$$

where

- $y=[y_i\,,~i\!=\!1,\dots, m]$ is a real vector,
- $A_0, A_1, A_2,\dots,A_m$ are $n\times n$ symmetric matrices $\mathbb{S}^n$,
- $B\succeq0$ is a generalized inequality meaning $B$ is a positive semidefinite matrix belonging to the positive semidefinite cone $\mathbb{S}_+$ in the subspace of symmetric matrices $\mathbb{S}$.

This linear matrix inequality specifies a convex constraint on $y$.

== Applications ==
There are efficient numerical methods to determine whether an LMI is feasible (e.g., whether there exists a vector y such that LMI(y) ≥ 0), or to solve a convex optimization problem with LMI constraints. Many optimization problems in control theory, system identification and signal processing can be formulated using LMIs. Also LMIs find application in Polynomial Sum-Of-Squares. The prototypical primal and dual semidefinite program is a minimization of a real linear function respectively subject to the primal and dual convex cones governing this LMI.

== Solving LMIs ==
A major breakthrough in convex optimization was the introduction of interior-point methods. These methods were developed in a series of papers and became of true interest in the context of LMI problems in the work of Yurii Nesterov and Arkadi Nemirovski.

== See also ==
- Semidefinite programming
- Spectrahedron
- Finsler's lemma
