= Stechkin's lemma =

In mathematics – more specifically, in functional analysis and numerical analysis – Stechkin's lemma is a result about the ℓ^{q} norm of the tail of a sequence, when the whole sequence is known to have finite ℓ^{p} norm. Here, the term "tail" means those terms in the sequence that are not among the N largest terms, for an arbitrary natural number N. Stechkin's lemma is often useful when analysing best-N-term approximations to functions in a given basis of a function space. The result was originally proved by Stechkin in the case $q = 2$.

== Statement of the lemma ==
Let $0 < p < q < \infty$ and let $I$ be a countable index set. Let $(a_{i})_{i \in I}$ be any sequence indexed by $I$, and for $N \in \mathbb{N}$ let $I_{N} \subset I$ be the indices of the $N$ largest terms of the sequence $(a_{i})_{i \in I}$ in absolute value. Then

$$\left( \sum_{i \in I \setminus I_{N}} | a_{i} |^{q} \right)^{1/q} \leq \left( \sum_{i \in I} | a_{i} |^{p} \right)^{1/p} \frac{1}{N^{r}}$$

where

$$r = \frac{1}{p} - \frac{1}{q} > 0$$.

Thus, Stechkin's lemma controls the ℓ^{q} norm of the tail of the sequence $(a_{i})_{i \in I}$ (and hence the ℓ^{q} norm of the difference between the sequence and its approximation using its $N$ largest terms) in terms of the ℓ^{p} norm of the full sequence and a rate of decay.

== Proof of the lemma ==
W.l.o.g. we assume that the sequence $(a_{i})_{i \in I}$ is sorted by $|a_{i+1}| \leq |a_{i}|, i \in I$ and we set $I= \mathbb{N}$ for notation.

First, we reformulate the statement of the lemma to

$$\left( \frac{1}{N} \sum_{i \in I \setminus I_{N}} | a_{i} |^{q} \right)^{1/q} \leq \left( \frac{1}{N} \sum_{j \in I} | a_{j} |^{p} \right)^{1/p}.$$

Now, we notice that for $d \in \mathbb{N}$

$$|a_i| \leq |a_{dN}|, \quad  \text{for} \quad  i=dN+1, \dots, (d+1)N;$$
$$|a_{dN}| \leq |a_j|, \quad  \text{for} \quad  j=(d-1)N+1, \dots, dN;$$

Using this, we can estimate

$$\left( \frac{1}{N} \sum_{i \in I \setminus I_{N}} | a_{i} |^{q} \right)^{1/q} \leq \left( \frac{1}{N} \sum_{d \in \mathbb{N}} N | a_{dN} |^{q} \right)^{1/q} = \left( \sum_{d \in \mathbb{N}} | a_{dN} |^{q} \right)^{1/q}$$

as well as

$$\left( \sum_{d \in \mathbb{N}} | a_{dN} |^{p} \right)^{1/p} = \left( \frac{1}{N} \sum_{d \in \mathbb{N}} N | a_{dN} |^{p} \right)^{1/p} \leq \left( \frac{1}{N} \sum_{i \in I} | a_{i} |^{p} \right)^{1/p}.$$

Also, we get by ℓ^{p} norm equivalence:

$$\left( \sum_{d \in \mathbb{N}} | a_{dN} |^{q} \right)^{1/q} \leq \left( \sum_{d \in \mathbb{N}} | a_{dN} |^{p} \right)^{1/p}.$$

Putting all these ingredients together completes the proof.
