= Stuart Walker (cricketer) =

Zimbabwean cricketer (born 1976)

Stuart Walker (born November 25, 1976) was a Zimbabwean cricketer. He was a right-handed batsman and a right-arm off-break bowler and wicket-keeper who played for Matabeleland. He was born in Bulawayo.

Walker made his first cricketing appearances for Queens Sports Club in the Dunlop National League in 1998 and 2000.

Walker represented Matabeleland on three occasions in the 2001-02 Logan Cup as an opening batsman. His highest total with the bat came in his second match, in which he scored 75 runs in partnership with Wisdom Siziba.
