= Stewart–Walker lemma =

The Stewart–Walker lemma provides necessary and sufficient conditions for the linear perturbation of a tensor field to be gauge-invariant. $\Delta \delta T = 0$ if and only if one of the following holds

1. $T_{0} = 0$

2. $T_{0}$ is a constant scalar field

3. $T_{0}$ is a linear combination of products of delta functions $\delta_{a}^{b}$

== Derivation ==
A 1-parameter family of manifolds denoted by $\mathcal{M}_{\epsilon}$ with $\mathcal{M}_{0} = \mathcal{M}^{4}$ has metric $g_{ik} = \eta_{ik} + \epsilon h_{ik}$. These manifolds can be put together to form a 5-manifold $\mathcal{N}$. A smooth curve $\gamma$ can be constructed through $\mathcal{N}$ with tangent 5-vector $X$, transverse to $\mathcal{M}_{\epsilon}$. If $X$ is defined so that if $h_{t}$ is the family of 1-parameter maps which map $\mathcal{N} \to \mathcal{N}$ and $p_{0} \in \mathcal{M}_{0}$ then a point $p_{\epsilon} \in \mathcal{M}_{\epsilon}$ can be written as $h_{\epsilon}(p_{0})$. This also defines a pull back $h_{\epsilon}^{*}$ that maps a tensor field $T_{\epsilon} \in \mathcal{M}_{\epsilon}$ back onto $\mathcal{M}_{0}$. Given sufficient smoothness a Taylor expansion can be defined

$$h_{\epsilon}^{*}(T_{\epsilon}) = T_{0} + \epsilon \, h_{\epsilon}^{*}(\mathcal{L}_{X}T_{\epsilon}) + O(\epsilon^{2})$$

$\delta T = \epsilon h_{\epsilon}^{*}(\mathcal{L}_{X}T_{\epsilon}) \equiv \epsilon (\mathcal{L}_{X}T_{\epsilon})_{0}$ is the linear perturbation of $T$. However, since the choice of $X$ is dependent on the choice of gauge another gauge can be taken. Therefore the differences in gauge become $\Delta \delta T = \epsilon(\mathcal{L}_{X}T_{\epsilon})_0 - \epsilon(\mathcal{L}_{Y}T_{\epsilon})_0 = \epsilon(\mathcal{L}_{X-Y}T_\epsilon)_0$. Picking a chart where $X^{a} = (\xi^\mu,1)$ and $Y^a = (0,1)$ then $X^{a}-Y^{a} = (\xi^{\mu},0)$ which is a well defined vector in any $\mathcal{M}_\epsilon$ and gives the result

$$\Delta \delta T = \epsilon \mathcal{L}_{\xi}T_0.$$

The only three possible ways this can be satisfied are those of the lemma.

== Sources ==
- Stewart J. (1991). Advanced General Relativity. Cambridge: Cambridge University Press. ISBN 0-521-44946-4. Describes derivation of result in section on Lie derivatives
